= Virginia Woolf =

English modernist writer (1882–1941)

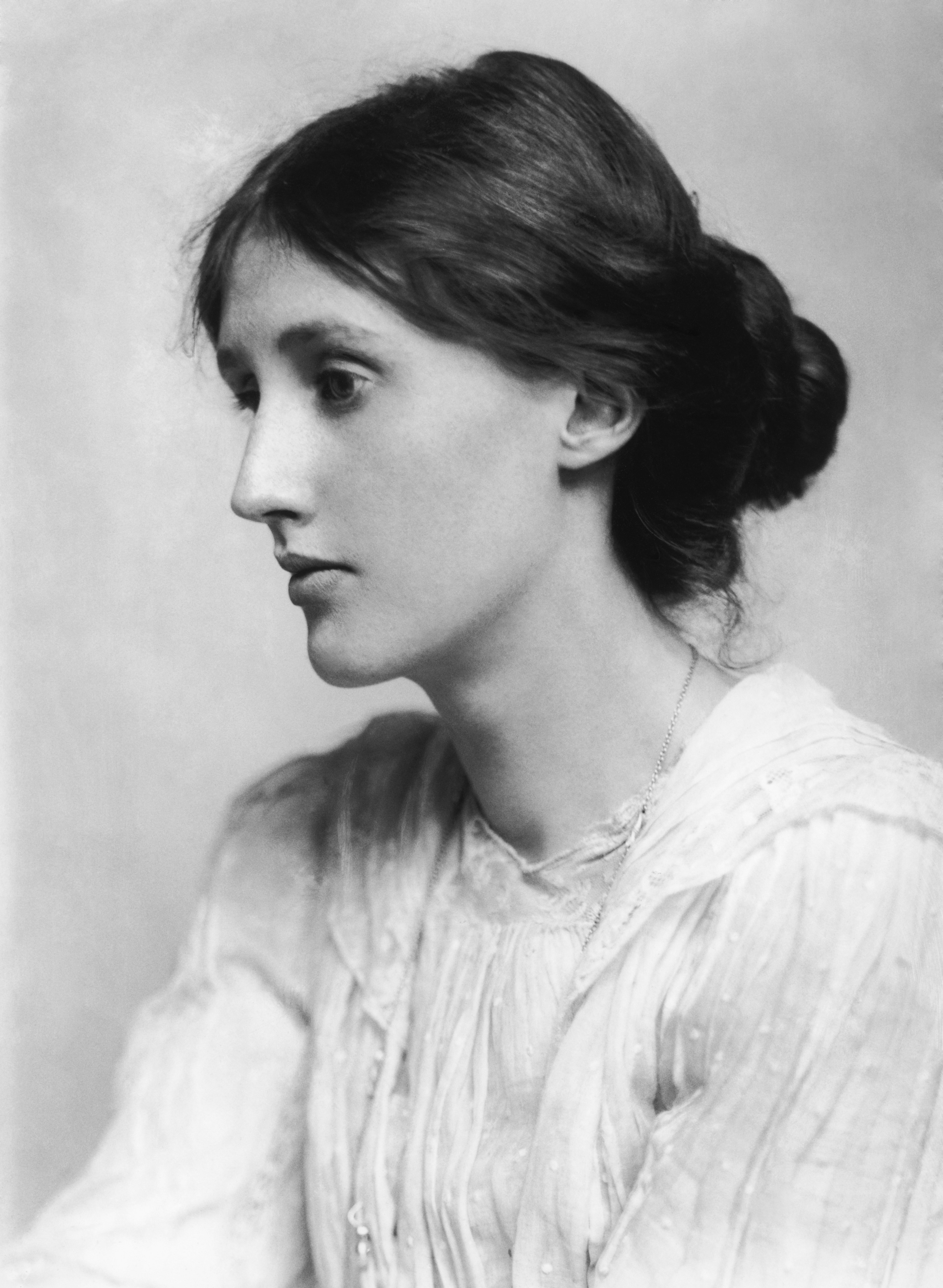
- Woolf in 1902
- Born: Adeline Virginia Stephen; 25 January 1882; South Kensington, London, England
- Died: 28 March 1941 (aged 59); Rodmell, East Sussex, England
- Education: King's College London
- Occupations: Novelist; essayist; publisher; critic
- Spouse: Leonard Woolf (m. 1912)
- Parents: Leslie Stephen; Julia Prinsep Jackson
- Relatives: Vanessa Stephen (sister); Thoby Stephen (brother); Adrian Stephen (brother); George Herbert Duckworth (half-brother); Gerald Duckworth (half-brother); Bella Sidney Woolf (sister-in-law); Katharine Stephen (cousin)
- Writing career
- Notable works: Mrs Dalloway (1925); To the Lighthouse (1927); Orlando (1928); A Room of One's Own (1929); The Waves (1931)
- Woolf's voice BBC Radio broadcast 29 April 1937

Adeline Virginia Woolf (/wʊlf/ "wolf"; née Stephen; 25 January 1882 – 28 March 1941) was an English writer and one of the most influential 20th-century modernist authors. She helped to pioneer the use of stream of consciousness narration as a literary device.

Virginia Woolf was born in South Kensington, London, into an affluent and intellectual family as the seventh child of Julia Prinsep Jackson and Leslie Stephen. She grew up in a blended household of eight children, including her sister, the painter Vanessa Bell. Educated at home in English classics and Victorian literature, Woolf later attended King's College London, where she studied classics and history and encountered early advocates for women's rights and education.

After the death of her father in 1904, Woolf and her siblings moved to the bohemian Bloomsbury district, where she became a founding member of the influential Bloomsbury Group. She married Leonard Woolf in 1912, and together they established the Hogarth Press in 1917, which published much of her work. They split their time between London and Sussex, maintaining their involvement in literary circles throughout their lives.

Woolf began publishing professionally in 1904 and rose to prominence during the interwar period with novels including Mrs Dalloway (1925), To the Lighthouse (1927), and Orlando (1928). She also wrote the influential feminist essay A Room of One's Own (1929), followed by Three Guineas (1938), which explores the roots of fascism in society. Her work became central to 1970s feminist criticism and remains influential worldwide, having been translated into more than 50 languages. Woolf's legacy endures through extensive scholarship, cultural portrayals, and tributes such as memorials, societies, and university buildings bearing her name.

== Life ==
=== Early life ===
Virginia Woolf was born Adeline Virginia Stephen on 25 January 1882, in Hyde Park Gate, South Kensington, London, to Julia (née Jackson) and Sir Leslie Stephen. Her father was a writer, historian, essayist, biographer, and mountaineer, while her mother was a noted philanthropist. Woolf's maternal relatives include Julia Margaret Cameron, a celebrated photographer, and Lady Henry Somerset, a campaigner for women's rights. Originally named after her aunt Adeline, Woolf did not use her first name due to her aunt's death in 1881. Virginia's great-nephew, the historian William Dalrymple, has claimed that Virginia was part Bengali through her maternal grandmother, Maria Theodosia Pattle.

Both of Virginia's parents had children from previous marriages. Julia's first marriage, to barrister Herbert Duckworth, produced three children: George, Stella, and Gerald. Leslie's first marriage, to Minny Thackeray, daughter of William Makepeace Thackeray, resulted in one daughter, Laura. Leslie and Julia Stephen had four children together: Vanessa, Thoby, Virginia, and Adrian.

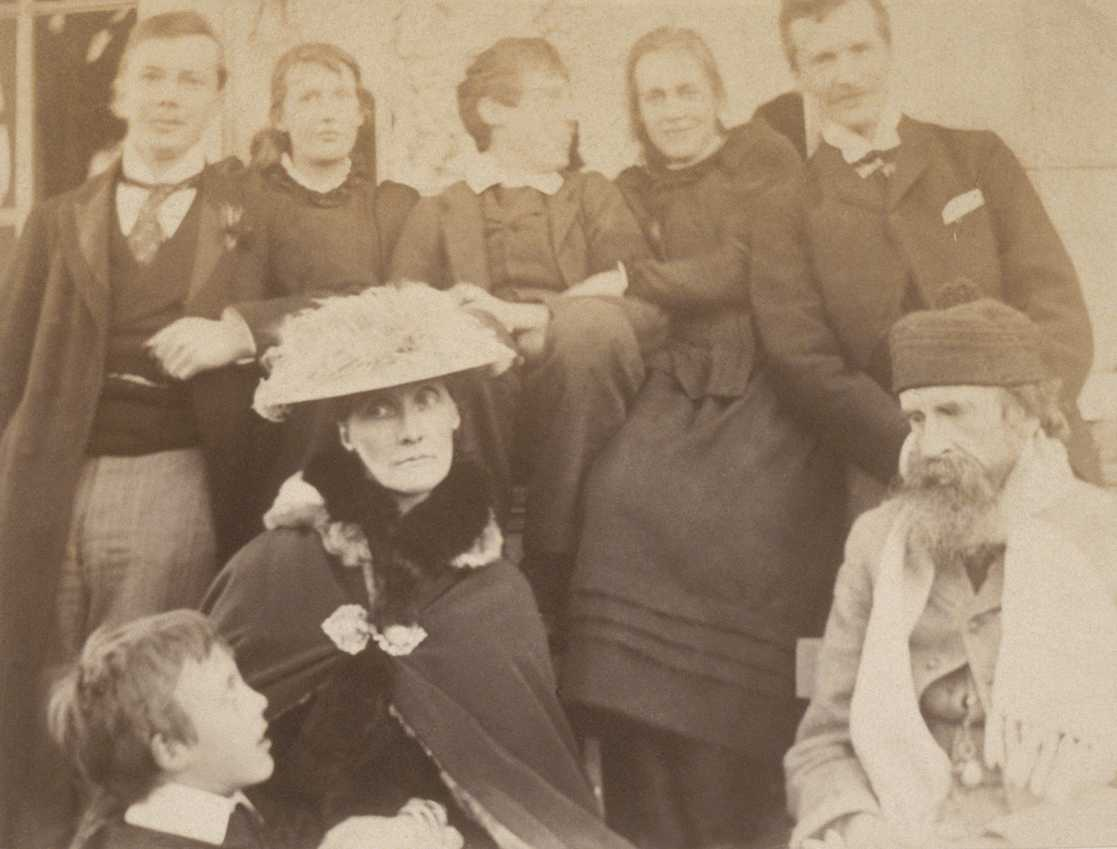
Duckworth/Stephen Family c. 1892. Back row: Gerald Duckworth, Virginia, Thoby and Vanessa Stephen, George Duckworth. Front row: Adrian, Julia, Leslie Stephen.

Virginia showed an early affinity for writing. By the age of five, she was writing letters, and her fascination with books helped her form a bond with her father. From the age of 10, she began an illustrated family newspaper, the Hyde Park Gate News, chronicling life and events within the Stephen family, and modelled on the popular magazine Tit-Bits. Virginia would run the Hyde Park Gate News until 1895. In 1897, Virginia began her first diary, which she kept for the next twelve years.

==== Talland House ====
In the spring of 1882, Leslie rented a large white house in St Ives, Cornwall. The family spent three months each summer there for the first 13 years of Virginia's life. Despite its limited amenities, the house's main attraction was the view of Porthminster Bay overlooking the Godrevy Lighthouse. The happy summers spent at Talland House would later influence Woolf's novels Jacob's Room, To the Lighthouse and The Waves.

At both Talland House and the family home, the family engaged with many literary and artistic figures. Frequent guests included Henry James, George Meredith, and James Russell Lowell. The family did not return to Talland House after 1894; a hotel was constructed in front of the house which blocked the sea view, and Julia Stephen died in May the following year.

==== Sexual abuse ====
In the 1939 essay "A Sketch of the Past", Woolf first disclosed that she had experienced childhood sexual abuse by her half-brother, Gerald Duckworth. There is speculation that this contributed to her mental health issues later in life. There are also suggestions of sexual impropriety from George Duckworth during the period that he was caring for the Stephen sisters when they were teenagers.

==== Adolescence ====
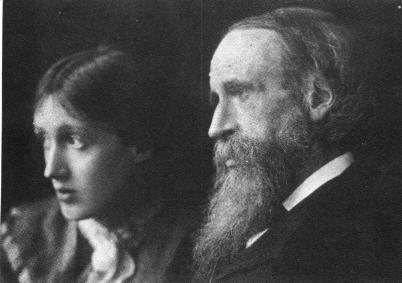
Virginia and Leslie Stephen, 1902

Her mother's death in 1895 precipitated what Virginia later identified as her first "breakdown"—for months afterwards she was nervous and agitated, and she wrote very little for the subsequent two years.

Stella Duckworth took on a parental role in the household. She married in April 1897 but remained closely involved with the Stephens, moving to a house very close to the Stephens to continue to support the family. However, she fell ill on her honeymoon and died in July of that same year. After Stella's death, George Duckworth took on the role of head of the household, and sought to bring Vanessa and Virginia into society. However, this experience did not resonate with either sister. Virginia later reflected on this societal expectation, stating: "Society in those days was a very competent, perfectly complacent, ruthless machine. A girl had no chance against its fangs. No other desires—say to paint, or to write—could be taken seriously." For Virginia, writing remained a priority. She began a new diary at the start of 1897 and filled notebooks with fragments and literary sketches.

In February 1904 Leslie Stephen died, which caused Virginia to suffer another period of mental instability, lasting from April to September. During this time she experienced a severe psychological crisis, which led to at least one suicide attempt. Woolf later described the period between 1897 and 1904 as "the seven unhappy years".

==== Education ====
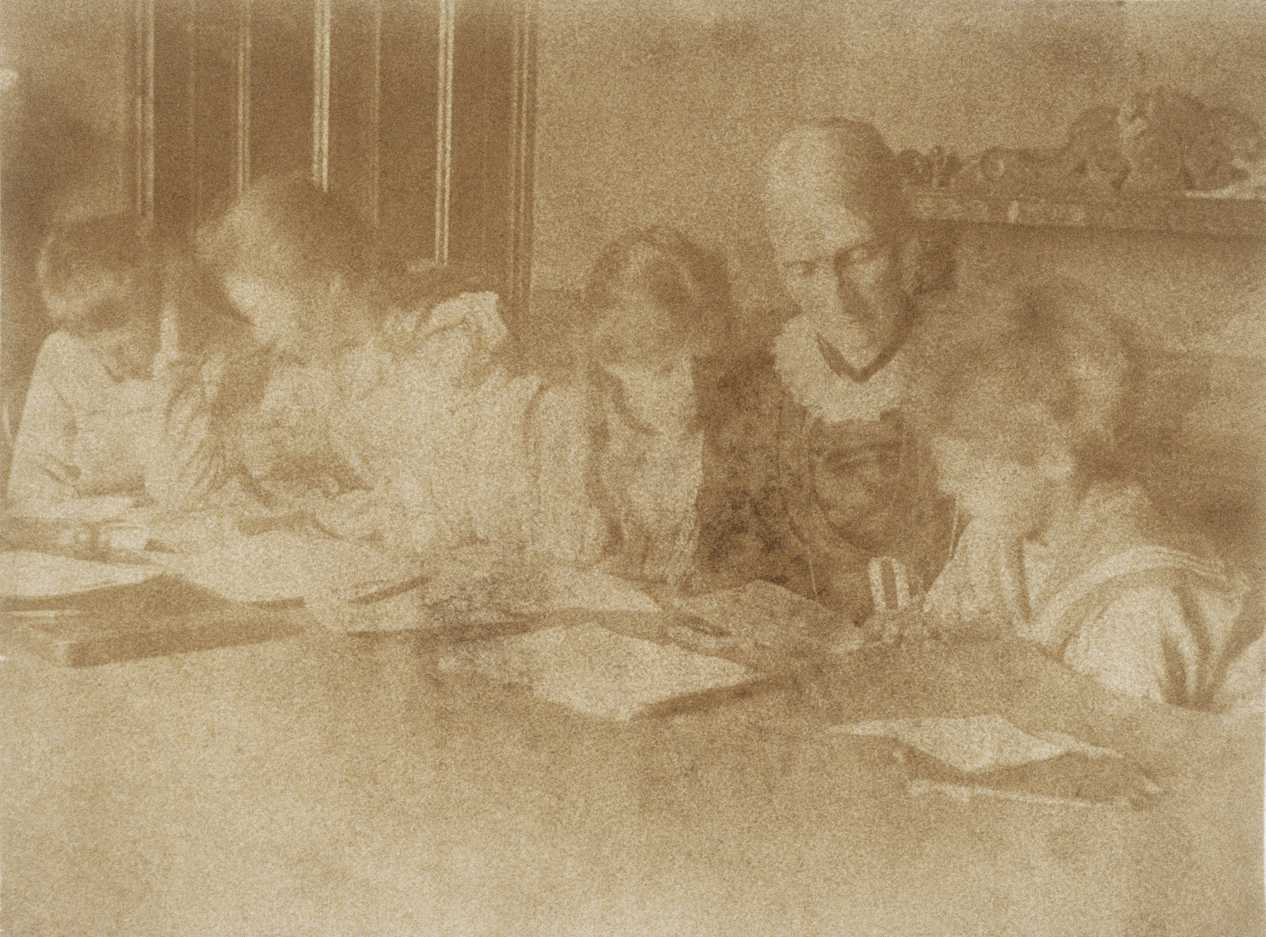
Virginia (third from left) with her mother and the Stephen children at their lessons, Talland House, c. 1894

As was common at the time, Virginia's mother did not believe in formal education for her daughters. Instead, Virginia was educated in a piecemeal fashion by her parents. She also received piano lessons. Virginia had unrestricted access to her father's vast library, exposing her to much of the literary canon. This resulted in a greater depth of reading than any of her Cambridge contemporaries. She later recalled:

Even today there may be parents who would doubt the wisdom of allowing a girl of fifteen the free run of a large and quite unexpurgated library. But my father allowed it. There were certain facts – very briefly, very shyly he referred to them. Yet "Read what you like", he said, and all his books...were to be had without asking.

Beginning in 1897, Virginia received private tutoring in Classical Greek and Latin. One of her tutors was Clara Pater, who was instrumental to her classical education, while another, Janet Case, became a lasting friend and introduced her to the suffrage movement. Virginia also attended lectures at the King's College Ladies' Department.

Although Virginia could not attend Cambridge, she was profoundly influenced by her brother Thoby's experiences there. When Thoby went to Trinity in 1899 he became part of an intellectual circle of young men, including Clive Bell, Lytton Strachey, Leonard Woolf (whom Virginia would later marry), and Saxon Sydney-Turner. He introduced his sisters to this circle at the Trinity May Ball in 1900. This circle formed a reading group that they named the Midnight Society, to which the Stephen sisters would later be invited.

=== Bloomsbury (1904–1912) ===
==== Gordon Square ====
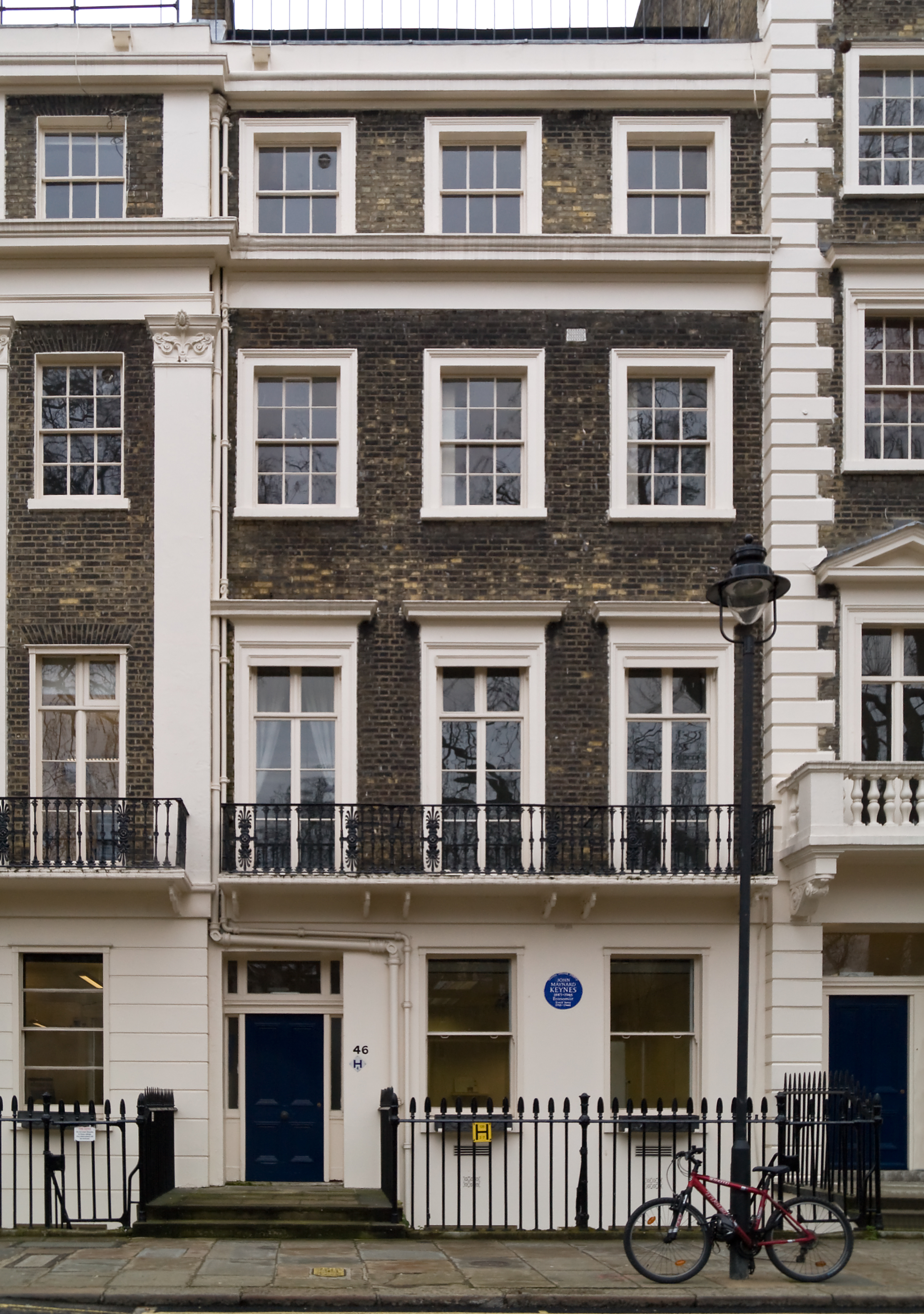
46 Gordon Square

After their father's death, Vanessa and Adrian Stephen decided to sell their family home in South Kensington and move to Bloomsbury, a more affordable area. Vanessa found a house at 46 Gordon Square. The Duckworth brothers did not join the Stephens in their new home; Gerald did not wish to, and George married and moved with his wife during the preparations. Virginia lived in the house for brief periods in the autumn – she was sent away to Cambridge and Yorkshire for her health. She eventually settled there permanently in December 1904.

From March 1905, the Stephens hosted gatherings with Thoby's intellectual friends at their home. Their social gatherings, referred to as "Thursday evenings", aimed to recreate the atmosphere at Trinity College. This circle formed the core of the intellectual circle of writers and artists known as the Bloomsbury Group. Later, it would include John Maynard Keynes, Duncan Grant, E. M. Forster, Roger Fry, and David Garnett. (Note: In the 1960s Leonard Woolf listed those people he considered to be "Old Bloomsbury" as: Vanessa and Clive Bell, Virginia and Leonard Woolf, Adrian and Karin Stephen, Lytton Strachey, Maynard Keynes, Duncan Grant, E. M. Forster, Saxon Sydney-Turner, Roger Fry, Desmond and Molly MacCarthy and later David Garnett and Julian, Quentin and Angelica Bell. Others add Ottoline Morrell, Dora Carrington and James and Alix Strachey. The "core" group are considered to be the Stephens and Thoby's closest Cambridge friends, Leonard Woolf, Clive Bell, Lytton Strachey and Saxon Sydney-Turner.) The group went on to gain notoriety for the Dreadnought hoax, in which they posed as a royal Abyssinian entourage. Among them, Virginia assumed the role of Prince Mendax.

The Stephens and their Bloomsbury Friends

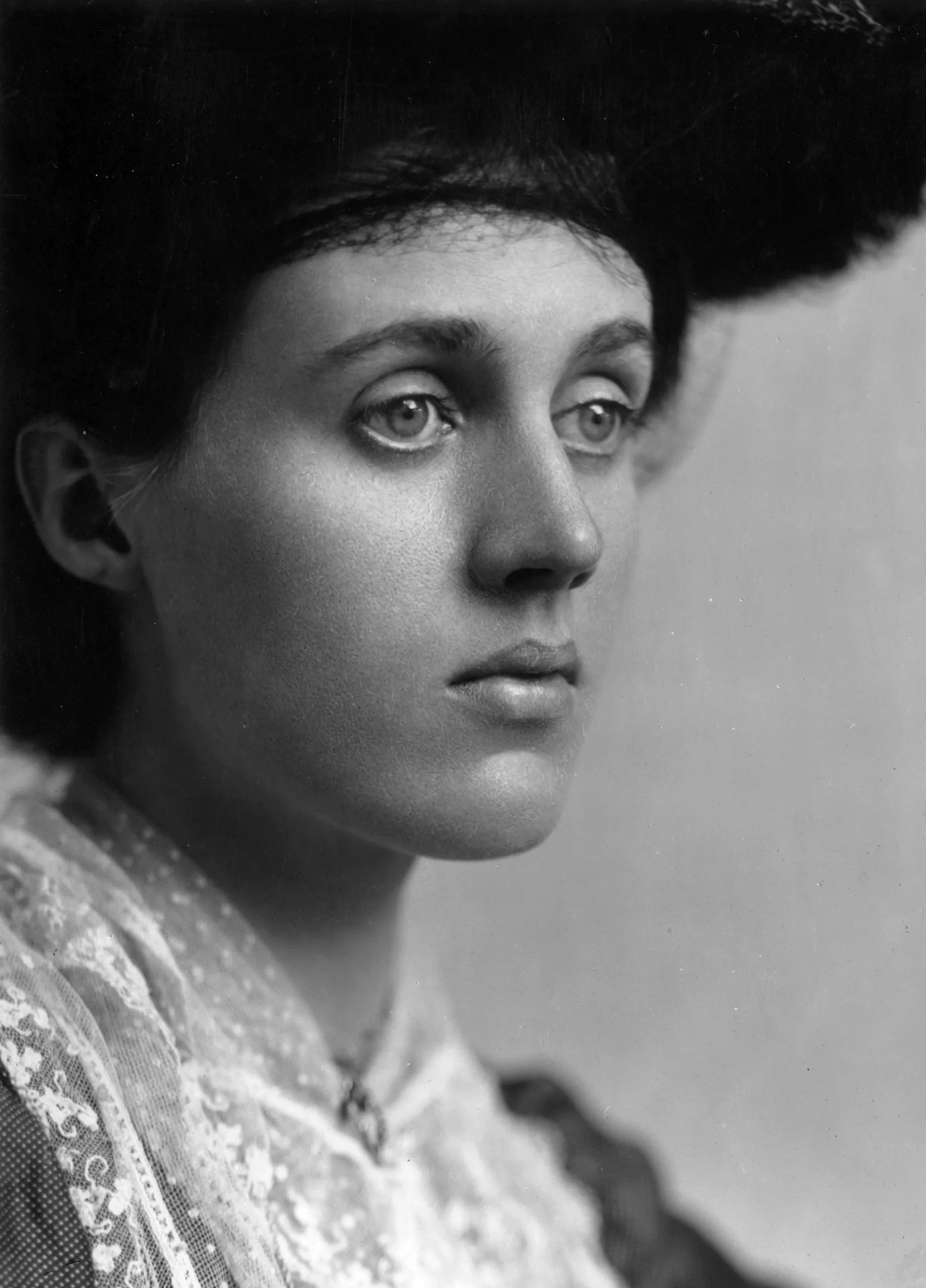
Vanessa Stephen 1902

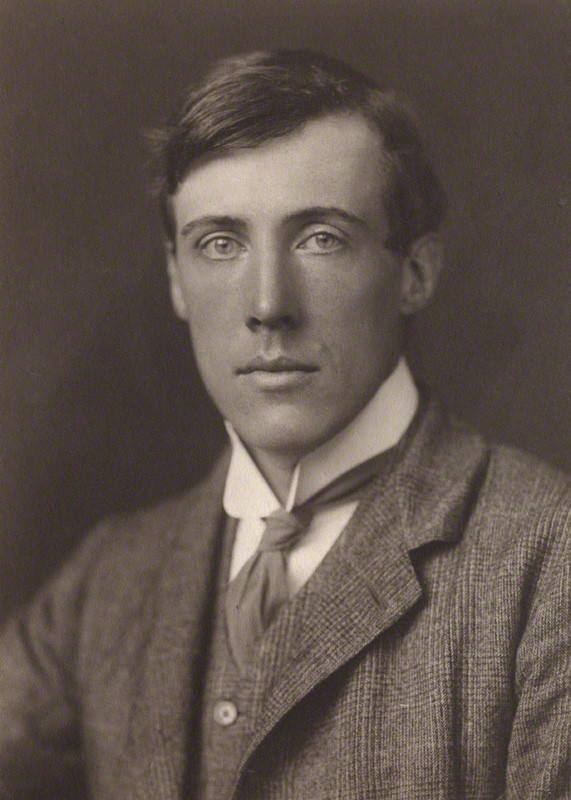
Thoby Stephen 1902

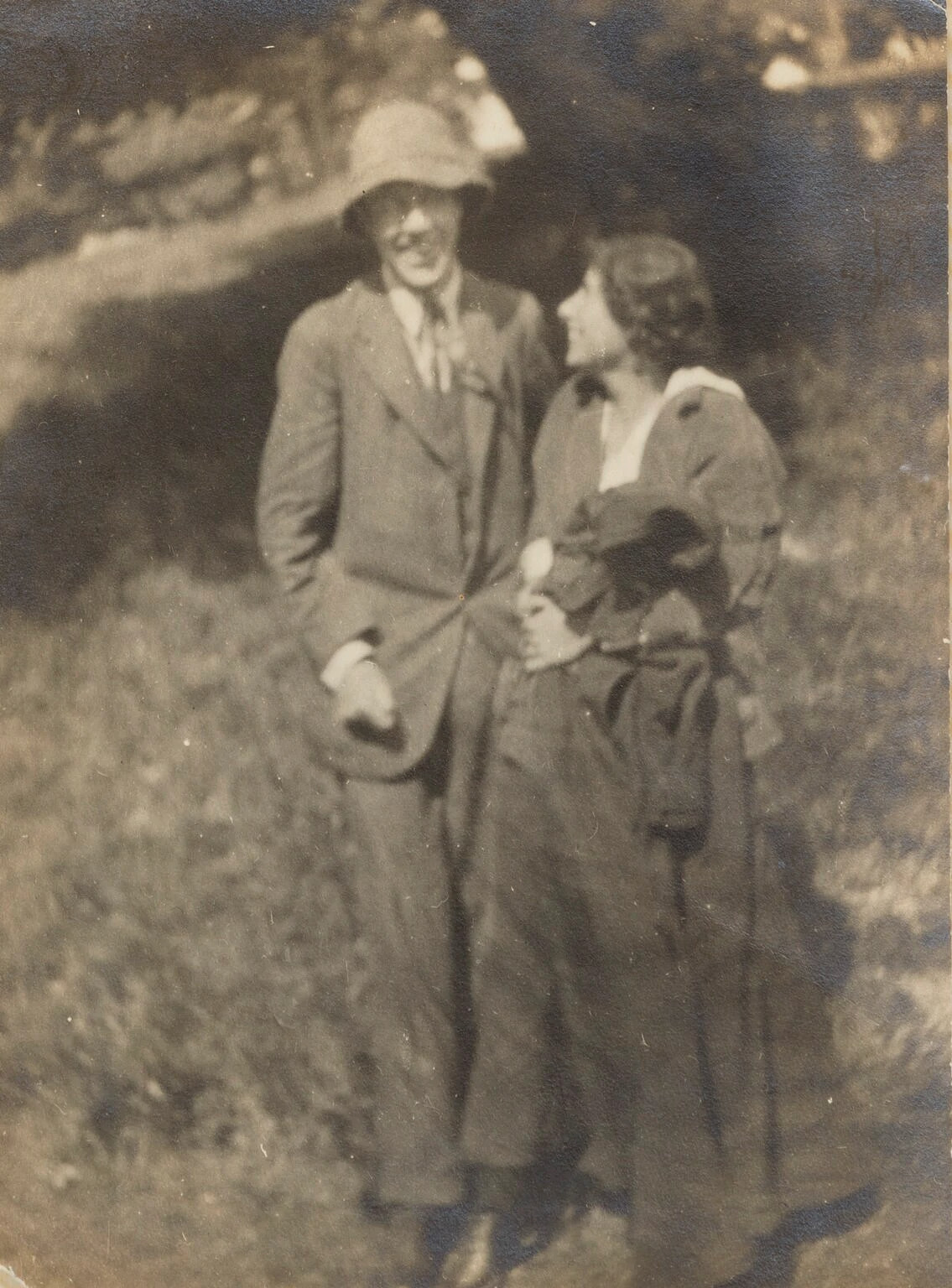
Adrian Stephen
Karin Stephen 1914

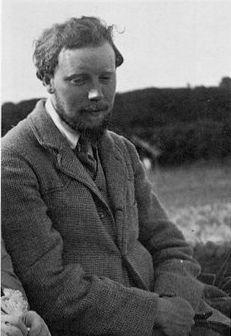
Clive Bell 1910

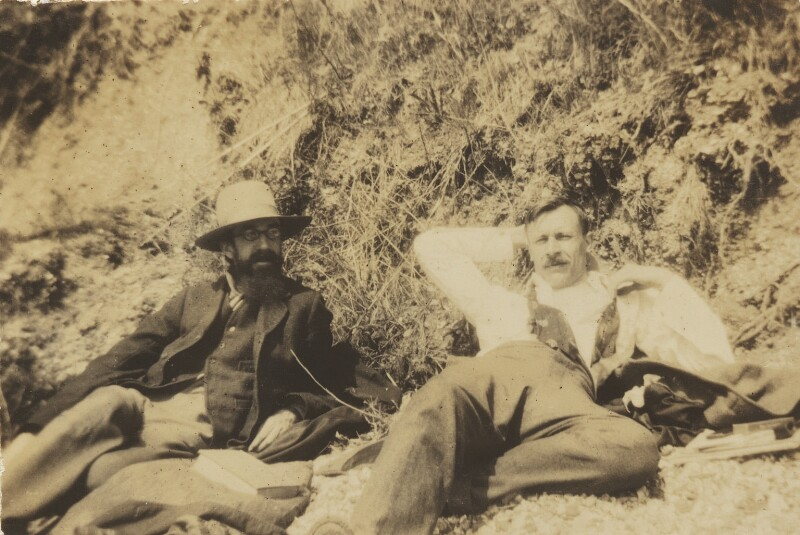
Lytton Strachey, Saxon Sydney-Turner 1917

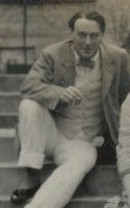
Desmond MacCarthy 1912

During this period, Virginia began teaching evening classes on a voluntary basis at Morley College and continued intermittently for the next two years. Her experience here would later influence themes of class and education in her novel Mrs Dalloway. She also made some money from reviews, including some published in church paper The Guardian and the National Review, capitalising on her father's literary reputation in order to earn commissions.

Vanessa added another event to their calendar with the "Friday Club", dedicated to the discussion of the fine arts. This gathering attracted some new members into their circle, including Henry Lamb, Gwen Darwin, and Katherine Laird ("Ka") Cox. Cox was to become Virginia's intimate friend. These new members brought the Bloomsbury Group into contact with another, slightly younger, group of Cambridge intellectuals whom Virginia would refer to as the "Neo-Pagans". The Friday Club continued until 1912 or 1913.

In the autumn of 1906, the siblings travelled to Greece and Turkey with Violet Dickinson. During the trip both Violet and Thoby contracted typhoid fever, which led to Thoby's death on 20 November of that year. Two days after Thoby's death, Vanessa accepted a previous proposal of marriage from Clive Bell. As a couple, their interest in avant-garde art would have an important influence on Virginia's further development as an author.

==== Fitzroy Square and Brunswick Square ====
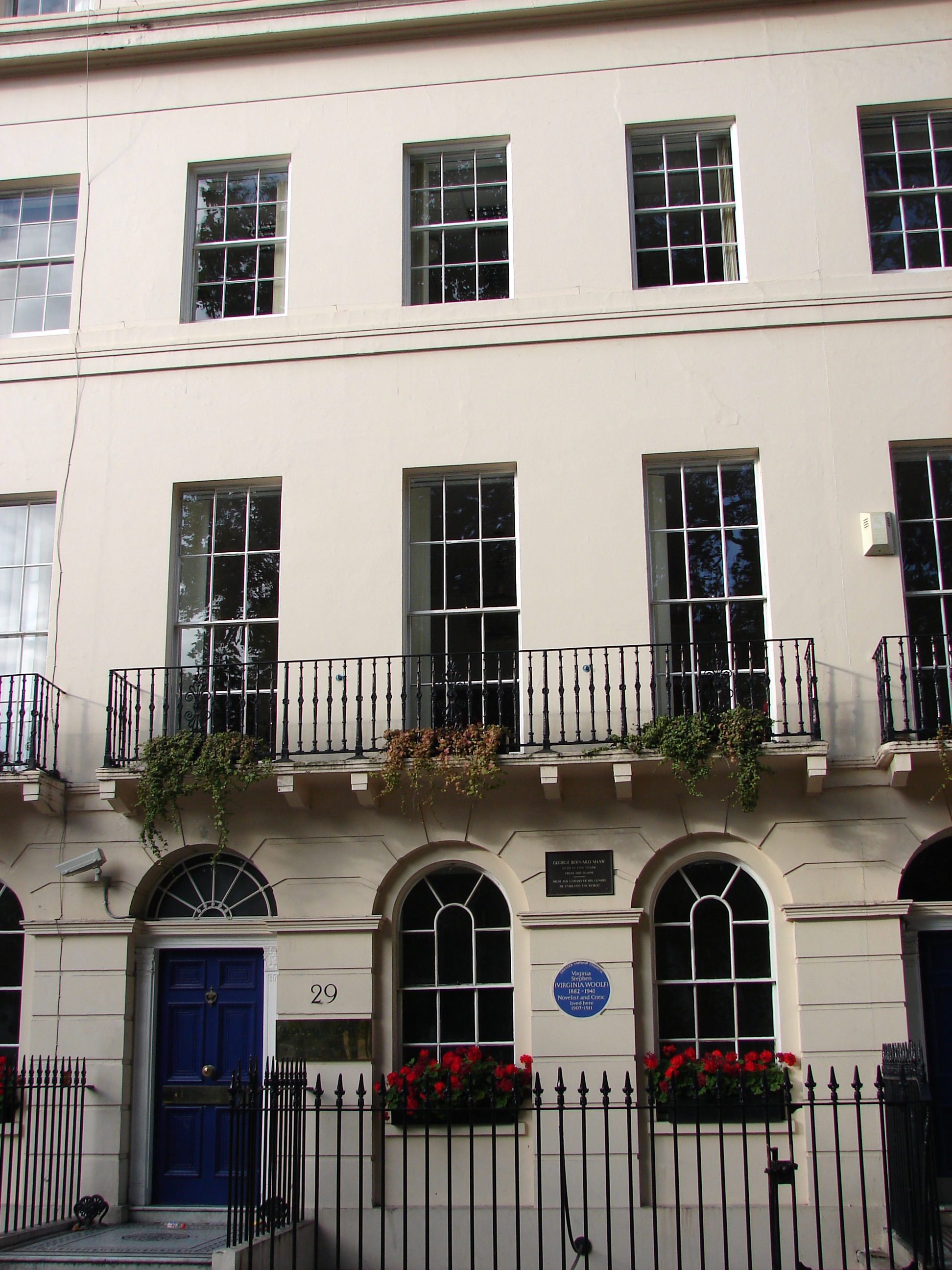
29 Fitzroy Square

After Vanessa's marriage, Virginia and Adrian moved into Fitzroy Square, still very close to Gordon Square. The new house had previously been occupied by George Bernard Shaw, and the area had been populated by artists since the previous century. Virginia resented the wealth that Vanessa's marriage had given her; Virginia and Adrian lived more humbly by comparison.

The siblings resumed the Thursday Club at their new home. During this period, the Bloomsbury group increasingly explored progressive ideas, with open discussions of sexuality. Virginia, however, appears not to have shown interest in practising the group's ideologies, finding an outlet for her sexual desires only in writing. Around this time she began work on her first novel, Melymbrosia, which eventually became The Voyage Out (1915). In 1907, Woolf also wrote her first mock-biographical set of three interconnected comic stories chronicling the adventures of a giantess named Violet, titled The Life of Violet, after Violet Dickinson, her first completed experiment in literary parody and biographical writing, anticipating her later experiments in prose.

In November 1911 Virginia and Adrian moved to a larger house in Brunswick Square, and invited John Maynard Keynes, Duncan Grant and Leonard Woolf to become lodgers there. Virginia saw it as a new opportunity: "We are going to try all kinds of experiments", she told Ottoline Morrell.

=== Asham House (1911–1919) ===
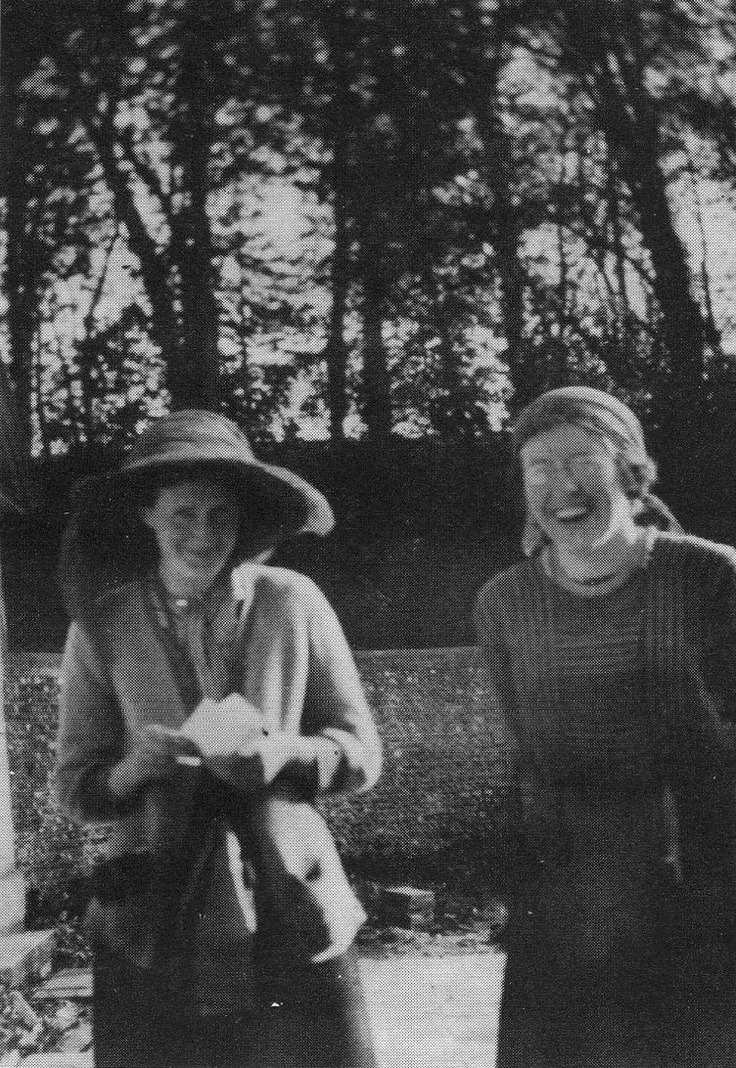
Virginia Stephen (L) with Katherine Cox, Asham 1912

During the later Bloomsbury years, Virginia travelled frequently with friends and family, to Dorset, Cornwall, and farther afield to Paris, Italy and Bayreuth. These trips were intended to prevent her from suffering exhaustion due to extended periods in London. The question arose of her needing a quiet country retreat close to London to support her still-fragile mental health. In the winter of 1910 she and Adrian stayed at Lewes and started exploring Sussex's surrounding area. She soon found a property in nearby Firle, which she named "Little Talland House"; she maintained a relationship with that region for the rest of her life, spending her time either in Sussex or London. (Note: Virginia was somewhat disparaging about the exterior of Little Talland House, describing it as an "eyesore" (Letter to Violet Dickinson 29 January 1911) and "inconceivably ugly, done up in patches of post-impressionist colour" (Letters, no. 561, April 1911).)

In September 1911 she and Leonard Woolf found Asham House (Note: Sometimes spelt "Asheham" or "Ascham".) nearby, and she and Vanessa took a joint lease on it. Located at the end of a tree-lined road, the house was in a Regency-Gothic style, "flat, pale, serene, yellow-washed", remote, without electricity or water and allegedly haunted. The sisters had two housewarming parties in January 1912.

Virginia recorded the weekends and holidays she spent there in her Asham Diary, part of which was later published as A Writer's Diary in 1953. Creatively, The Voyage Out was completed there, as was much of Night and Day. The house itself inspired the short story "A Haunted House", published in A Haunted House and Other Short Stories. Asham provided Virginia with much-needed relief from the London's fast-paced life and was where she found happiness that she expressed in her diary on 5 May 1919: "Oh, but how happy we've been at Asheham! It was a most melodious time. Everything went so freely; – but I can't analyse all the sources of my joy".

Houses in Sussex

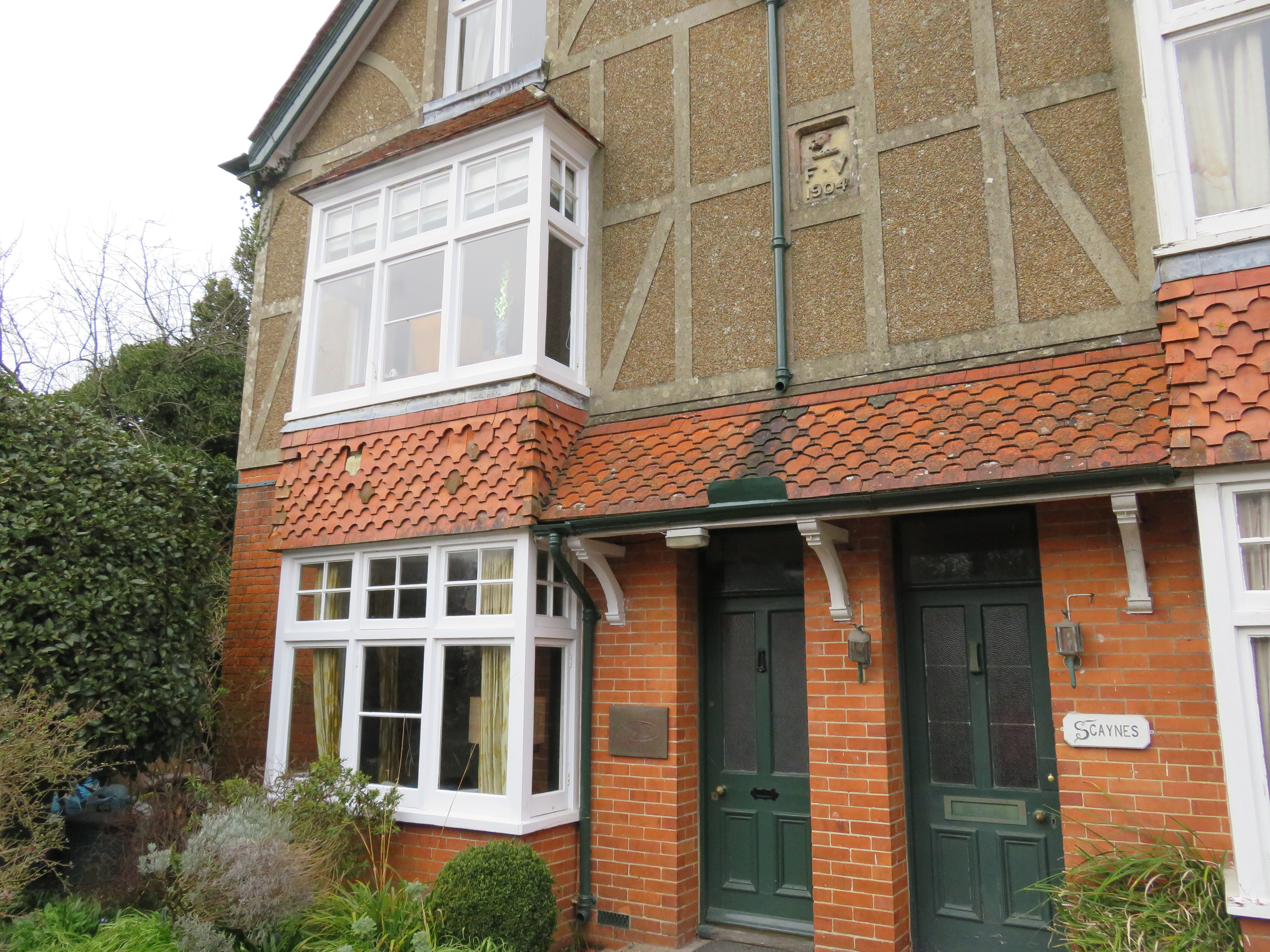
Little Talland House, Firle

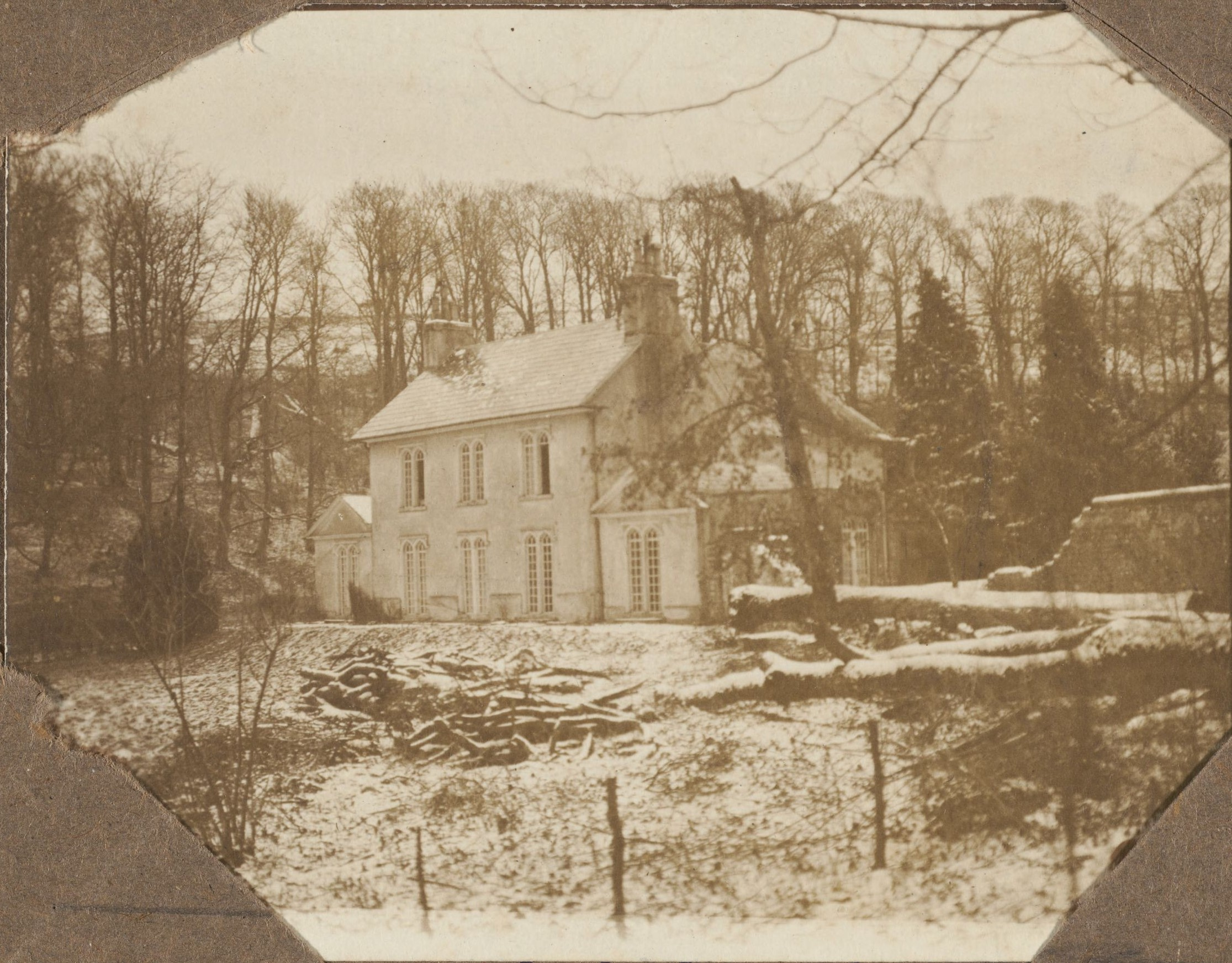
Asham House, Beddingham

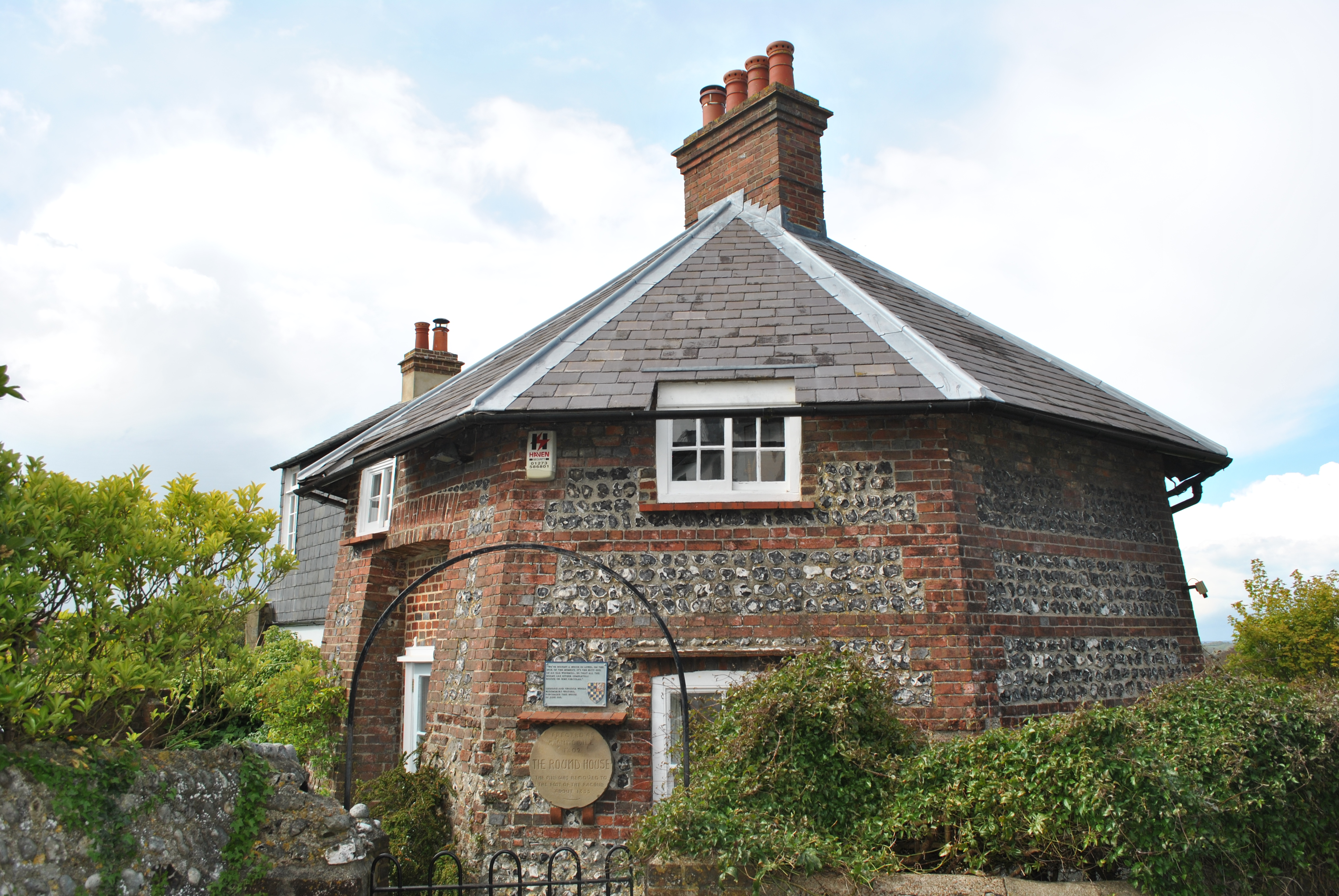
The Round House, Lewes

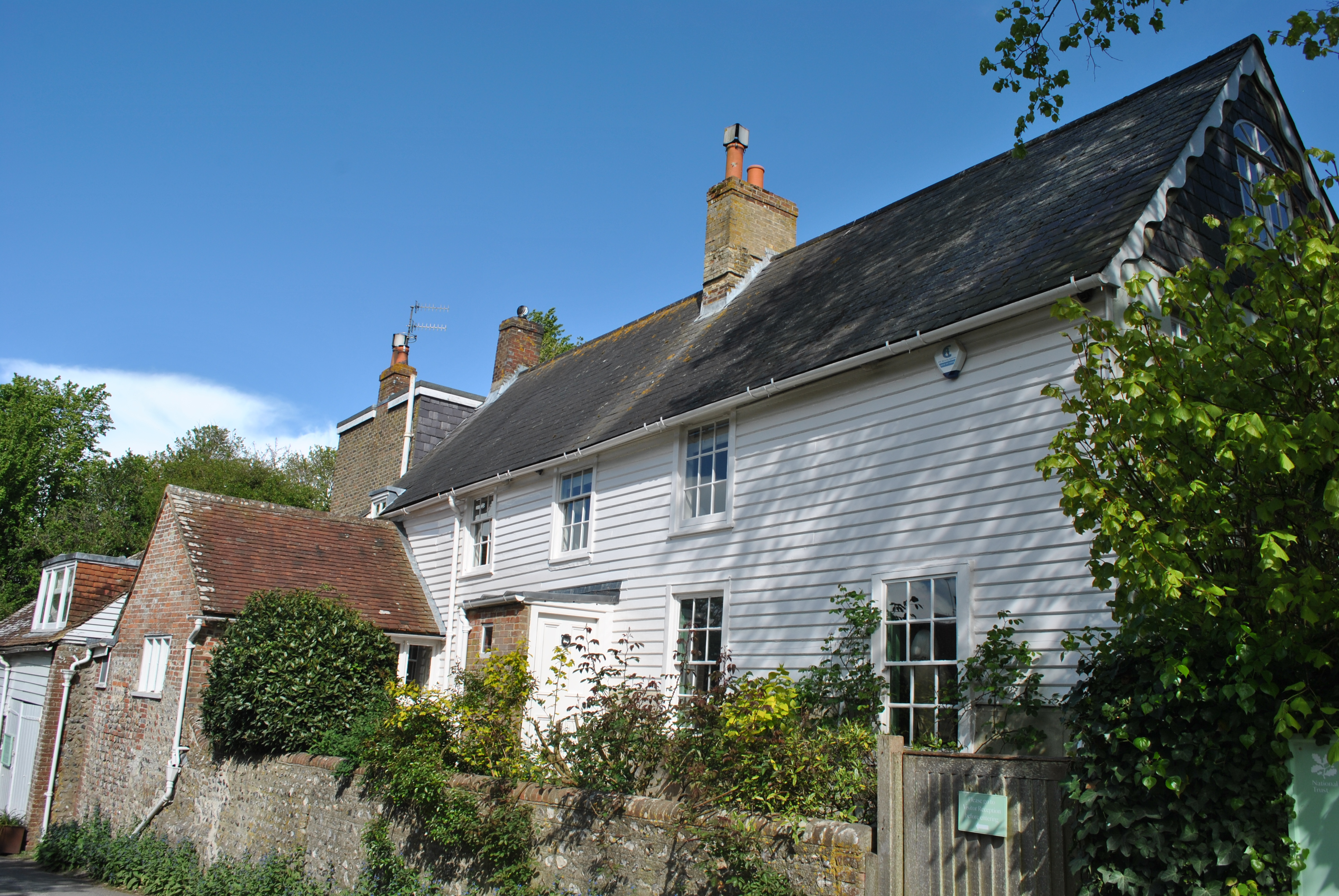
Monk's House, Rodmell

While at Asham, in 1916 Leonard and Virginia found a farmhouse about four miles away that they thought would be ideal for her sister. Eventually, Vanessa visited to inspect it, and took possession in October of that year, establishing it as a summer home for her family. The Charleston Farmhouse was to become the summer gathering place for the Bloomsbury Group.

=== Marriage and war (1912–1920) ===
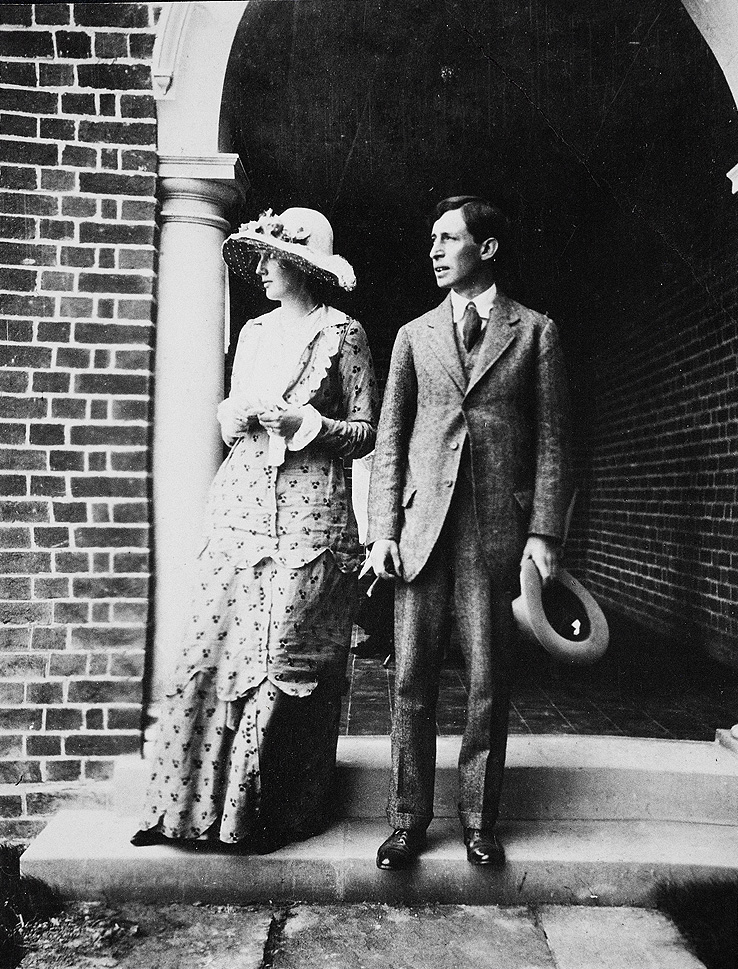
Engagement photograph, Virginia and Leonard Woolf, 23 July 1912

Leonard Woolf was one of Thoby Stephen's friends at Trinity College, Cambridge, and had encountered the Stephen sisters in Thoby's rooms while visiting for May Week between 1899 and 1904. He recalled that in "white dresses and large hats, with parasols in their hands, their beauty literally took one's breath away". In 1904 Leonard left Britain for a civil service position in Ceylon, but returned for a year's leave in 1911 after letters from Lytton Strachey, describing Virginia's beauty, enticed him back. He and Virginia attended social engagements together, and he moved into Brunswick Square as a tenant in December of that year.

Leonard proposed to Virginia on 11 January 1912. Initially she expressed reluctance, but the two continued courting. Leonard decided not to return to Ceylon and resigned from his post. On 29 May Virginia declared her love for Leonard, and they married on 10 August at St Pancras Town Hall. The couple spent their honeymoon first at Asham and the Quantock Hills before travelling to the south of France, Spain and Italy. Upon returning, they moved to Clifford's Inn, and began to divide their time between London and Asham. Though Virginia wanted to have children, Leonard refused, as he believed Virginia was not mentally strong enough to be a mother, and worried that having children might worsen her mental health.

Virginia had completed a penultimate draft of her first novel The Voyage Out before her wedding but made large-scale alterations to the manuscript between December 1912 and March 1913. The work was later accepted by her half-brother Gerald Duckworth's publishing house, and she found the process of reading and correcting the proofs extremely emotionally difficult. This led to one of several breakdowns over the next two years; Virginia attempted suicide on 9 September 1913 with an overdose of Veronal, being saved with the help of surgeon Geoffrey Keynes. Virginia's illness led to Duckworth delaying the publication of The Voyage Out until 26 March 1915.

In the autumn of 1914 the couple moved to a house on Richmond Green. In late March 1915 they moved to Hogarth House, after which they named their publishing house in 1917. The decision to move to London's suburbs was made for the sake of Virginia's health. Many of Virginia's friends were against the war, and Virginia herself opposed it from a standpoint of pacifism and anti-censorship. Leonard was exempted from the introduction of conscription in 1916 on medical grounds. The Woolfs employed two servants at the recommendation of Roger Fry in 1916; Lottie Hope worked for some other Bloomsbury Group members, and Nellie Boxall would stay with them until 1934.

The Woolfs spent parts of the World War I era in Asham but were obliged by the owner to leave in 1919. "In despair" they purchased the Round House in Lewes. No sooner had they bought the Round House, than Monk's House in nearby Rodmell came up for auction, a weatherboarded house with oak-beamed rooms, said to date from the 15th or 16th century. The Woolfs sold the Round House and purchased Monk's House for £700. Monk's House also lacked running water but came with an acre of garden, and had a view across the Ouse towards the hills of the South Downs. Leonard Woolf describes this view as being unchanged since the days of Chaucer. The Woolfs would retain Monk's House until the end of Virginia's life; it became their permanent home after their London home was bombed, and it was where she completed Between the Acts in early 1941, which was followed by her final breakdown and suicide in the nearby River Ouse on 28 March.

=== Further works (1920–1940) ===
==== Memoir Club ====
Bloomsberries

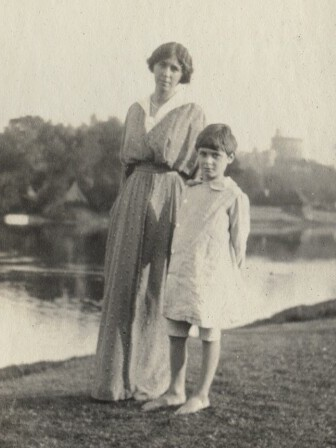
Mary MacCarthy and son 1915

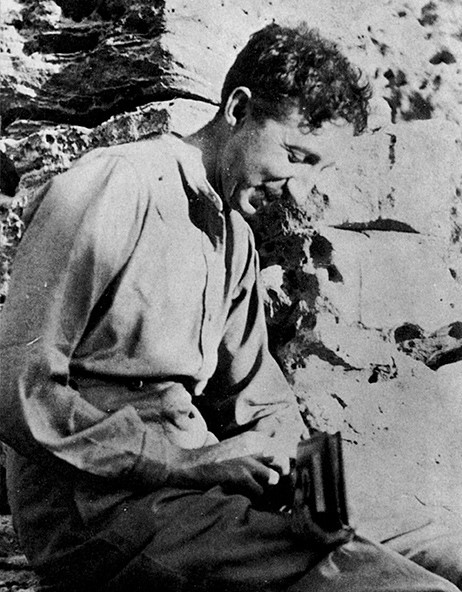
E. M. Forster 1917

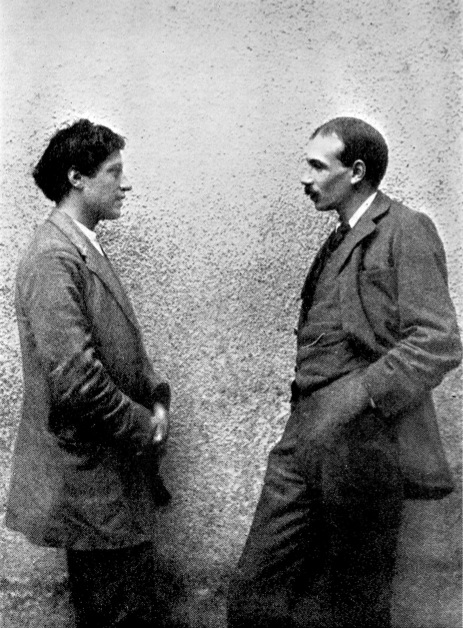
Duncan Grant (L)
John Maynard Keynes 1912

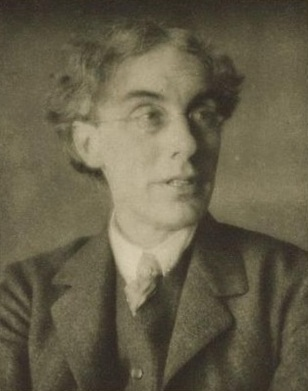
Roger Fry 1913

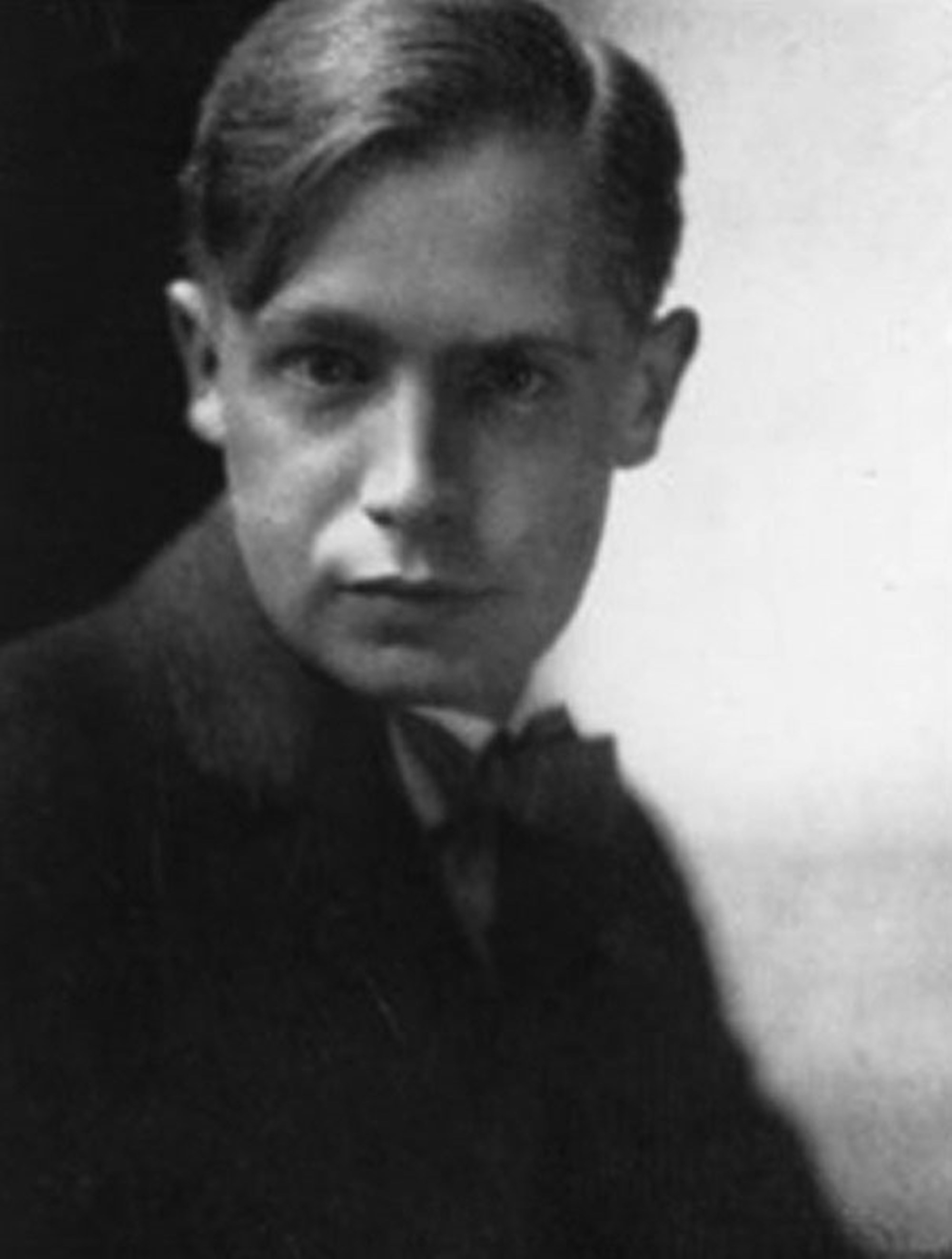
David Garnett c. 1902

1920 saw a postwar reconstitution of the Bloomsbury Group, under the title of the Memoir Club, which as the name suggests focused on self-writing, in the manner of Proust's À la recherche, and inspired some of the more influential books of the 20th century. The Group, which had been scattered by the war, was reconvened by Mary ("Molly") MacCarthy who called them "Bloomsberries", and operated under rules derived from the Cambridge Apostles, an elite university debating society of which some of them had been members. These rules emphasised candour and openness. Among the 125 memoirs presented, Virginia contributed three that were published posthumously in 1976, in the autobiographical anthology Moments of Being. These were 22 Hyde Park Gate (1921), Old Bloomsbury (1922) and Am I a Snob? (1936).

==== Vita Sackville-West ====
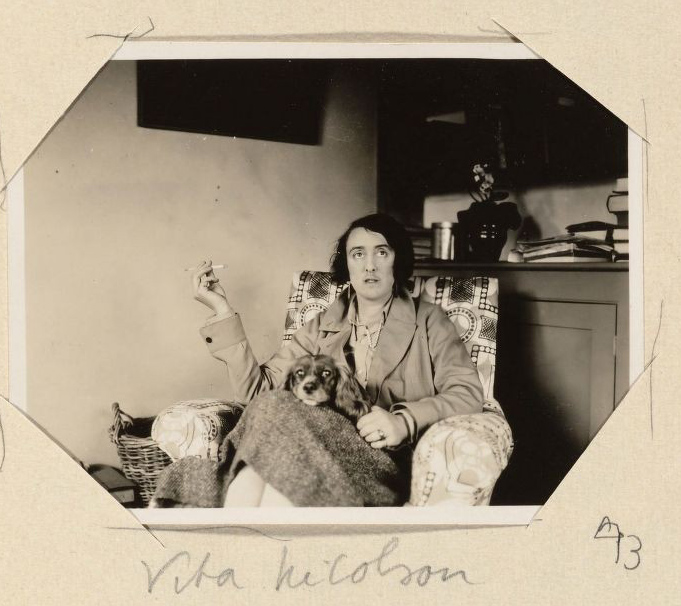
Vita Sackville-West at Monk's House c. 1934

On 14 December 1922 Woolf met the writer and gardener Vita Sackville-West, wife of Harold Nicolson. This period was to prove fruitful for both authors, Woolf producing three novels, To the Lighthouse (1927), Orlando (1928), and The Waves (1931) as well as a number of essays, including "Mr. Bennett and Mrs. Brown" (1924) and "A Letter to a Young Poet" (1932). The two women remained friends until Woolf's death in 1941.

Virginia Woolf also remained close to her surviving siblings, Adrian and Vanessa.

==== Further novels and non-fiction ====
Between 1924 and 1940 the Woolfs returned to Bloomsbury, taking out a ten-year lease at 52 Tavistock Square, from where they ran the Hogarth Press from the basement, where Virginia also had her writing room.

1925 saw the publication of Mrs Dalloway in May followed by her collapse while at Charleston in August. In 1927, her next novel, To the Lighthouse, was published, and the following year she lectured on Women & Fiction at Cambridge University and published Orlando in October.

Her two Cambridge lectures then became the basis for her major essay A Room of One's Own in 1929. Virginia wrote only one drama, Freshwater, based on her great-aunt Julia Margaret Cameron, and produced at her sister's studio on Fitzroy Street in 1935. 1936 saw the publication of The Years, which had its origin in a lecture Woolf gave to the National Society for Women's Service in 1931, an edited version of which would later be published as "Professions for Women". Another collapse of her health followed the novel's completion The Years.

The Woolfs' final residence in London was at 37 Mecklenburgh Square (1939–1940), destroyed during the Blitz in September 1940; a month later their previous home on Tavistock Square was also destroyed. After that, they made Sussex their permanent home.

== Death ==
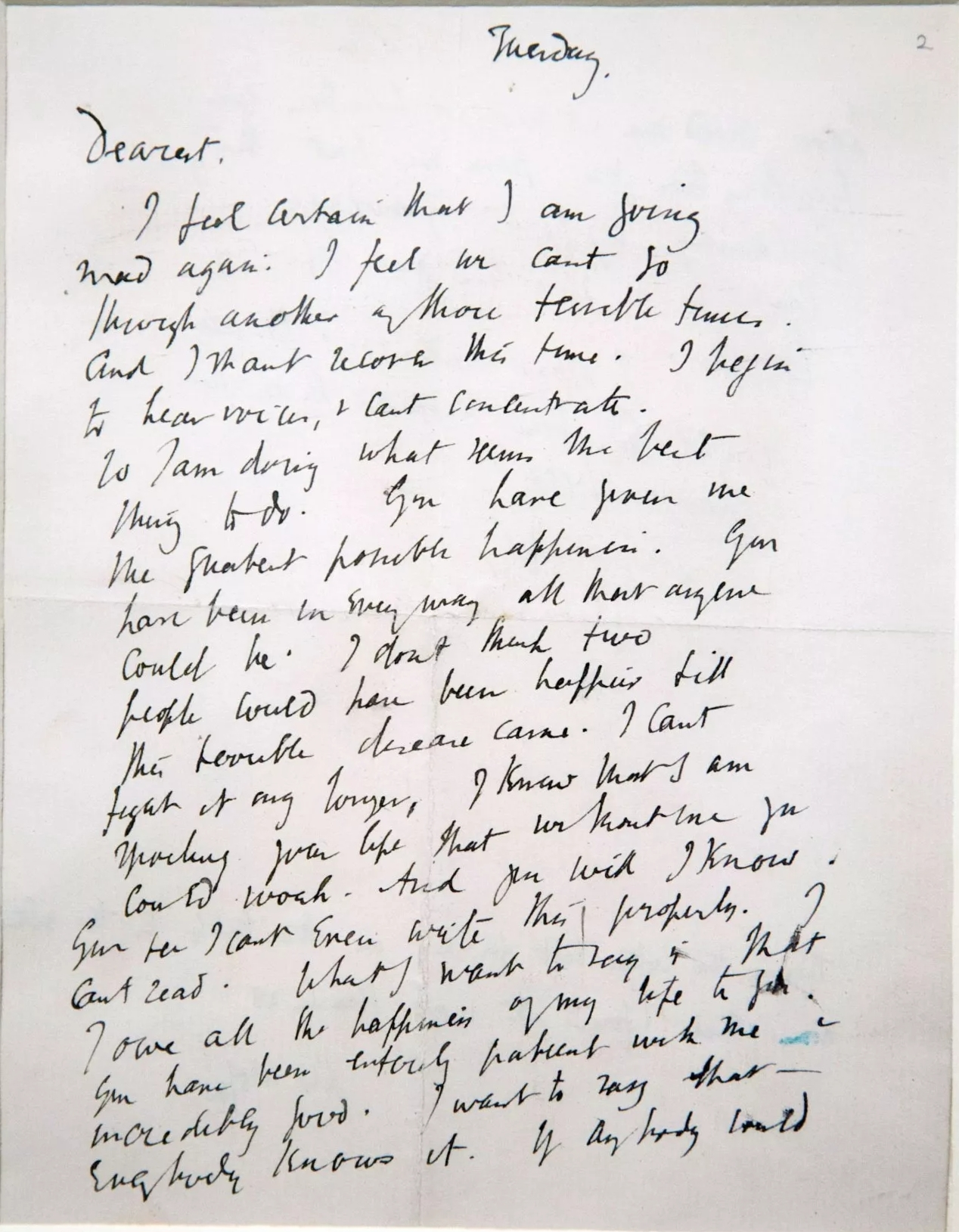
Woolf's suicide letter to her husband

After completing the manuscript of her last novel (posthumously published), Between the Acts (1941), Woolf fell into a depression similar to one that she had earlier experienced. The onset of the Second World War, the destruction of her London home during the Blitz, and the cold reception given to her biography of her late friend Roger Fry all worsened her condition until she was unable to work. When Leonard enlisted in the Home Guard, Virginia disapproved. She held fast to her pacifism and criticised her husband for wearing what she considered to be "the silly uniform of the Home Guard".

After the Second World War began, Woolf's diary indicates that she was obsessed with death, which figured more and more as her mood darkened. On 28 March 1941, Woolf drowned herself by walking into the fast-flowing River Ouse near her home, after placing a large stone in her pocket. Her body was not found until 18 April. Her husband buried her cremated remains beneath an elm tree in the garden of Monk's House, their home in Rodmell, Sussex.

In her suicide note, addressed to her husband, she wrote:

Dearest, I feel certain that I am going mad again. I feel we can't go through another of those terrible times. And I shan't recover this time. I begin to hear voices, and I can't concentrate. So I am doing what seems the best thing to do. You have given me the greatest possible happiness. You have been in every way all that anyone could be. I don't think two people could have been happier till this terrible disease came. I can't fight it any longer. I know that I am spoiling your life, that without me you could work. And you will I know. You see I can't even write this properly. I can't read. What I want to say is I owe all the happiness of my life to you. You have been entirely patient with me and incredibly good. I want to say that—everybody knows it. If anybody could have saved me, it would have been you. Everything has gone from me but the certainty of your goodness. I can't go on spoiling your life any longer. I don't think two people could have been happier than we have been. V.

== Mental health ==
Much examination has been made of Woolf's mental health. From the age of 13, following the death of her mother, Woolf suffered periodic mood swings. However, Hermione Lee asserts that Woolf was not "mad"; she was merely a woman who suffered from and struggled with illness for much of her life, a woman of "exceptional courage, intelligence and stoicism", who made the best use, and achieved the best understanding she could, of that illness. Writer and social anthropologist Camille Caprioglio suggests that Woolf may have been autistic, a possible contributing factor to her mental health struggles. In contemporary terms, the majority of her symptoms are most readily attributed to bipolar disorder.

Her mother's death in 1895, "the greatest disaster that could happen", precipitated a crisis for which their family doctor, Dr. Seton, prescribed rest, stopping lessons and writing, and regular walks supervised by Stella. Yet just two years later, Stella too was dead, bringing on Virginia's first expressed wish for death at the age of 15. This was a scenario she would later recreate in "Time Passes" (To the Lighthouse, 1927).

The death of her father in 1904 provoked her most alarming collapse, on 10 May, when she threw herself out of a window and was briefly institutionalised under the care of her father's friend, the eminent psychiatrist George Savage. She spent time recovering at the house of Stella's friend Violet Dickinson, and at her aunt Caroline Stephen's house in Cambridge, and by January 1905, Savage considered her cured.

Her brother Thoby's death in 1906 marked a "decade of deaths" that ended her childhood and adolescence.

On Savage's recommendation, Virginia spent three short periods in 1910, 1912, and 1913 at Burley House at 15 Cambridge Park, Twickenham, described as "a private nursing home for women with nervous disorder" run by Miss Jean Thomas. By the end of February 1910, she was becoming increasingly restless, and Savage suggested being away from London. Vanessa rented Moat House, outside Canterbury, in June, but there was no improvement, so Savage sent her to Burley for a "rest cure". This involved partial isolation, deprivation of literature, and force-feeding, and after six weeks she was able to convalesce in Cornwall and Dorset during the autumn.

She loathed the experience; writing to her sister on 28 July, she described how she found the religious atmosphere stifling and the institution ugly, and informed Vanessa that to escape "I shall soon have to jump out of a window". The threat of being sent back would later lead to her contemplating suicide. Despite her protests, Savage would refer her back in 1912 for insomnia and in 1913 for depression.

On emerging from Burley House in September 1913, she sought further opinions from two other physicians on the 13th: Maurice Wright, and Henry Head, who had been Henry James's physician. Both recommended she return to Burley House. Distraught, she returned home and attempted suicide by taking an overdose of 100 grains of veronal (a barbiturate) and nearly dying.

On recovery, she went to Dalingridge Hall, George Duckworth's home in East Grinstead, Sussex, to convalesce on 30 September, returning to Asham on 18 November. She remained unstable over the next two years, with another incident involving veronal that she claimed was an "accident", and consulted another psychiatrist in April 1914, Maurice Craig, who explained that she was not sufficiently psychotic to be certified or committed to an institution.

The rest of the summer of 1914 went better for her, and they moved to Richmond, but in February 1915, just as The Voyage Out was due to be published, she relapsed once more, and remained in poor health for most of that year. Then she began to recover, following 20 years of ill health. Nevertheless, there was a feeling among those around her that she was now permanently changed, and not for the better.

Over the rest of her life, she suffered recurrent bouts of depression. In 1940, a number of factors appeared to overwhelm her. Her biography of Roger Fry had been published in July, and she had been disappointed in its reception. The horrors of war depressed her, and their London homes had been destroyed in the Blitz in September and October. Woolf had completed Between the Acts (published posthumously in 1941) in November, and completing a novel was frequently accompanied by exhaustion. Her health became increasingly a matter of concern, culminating in her decision to end her life on 28 March 1941.

She also suffered many physical ailments such as headaches, backache, fevers and faints, which related closely to her psychological stress. These often lasted for weeks or even months, and impeded her work: "What a gap! ... for 60 days; & those days spent in wearisome headache, jumping pulse, aching back, frets, fidgets, lying awake, sleeping draughts, sedatives, digitalis, going for a little walk, & plunging back into bed again."

Though this instability would frequently affect her social life, she was able to continue her literary productivity with few interruptions throughout her life. Woolf herself provides not only a vivid picture of her symptoms in her diaries and letters but also her response to the demons that haunted her and at times made her long for death: "But it is always a question whether I wish to avoid these glooms... These 9 weeks give one a plunge into deep waters... One goes down into the well & nothing protects one from the assault of truth."

Psychiatry had little to offer Woolf, but she recognised that writing was one of the behaviours that enabled her to cope with her illness: "The only way I keep afloat... is by working... Directly I stop working I feel that I am sinking down, down. And as usual, I feel that if I sink further I shall reach the truth." Sinking underwater was Woolf's metaphor for both the effects of depression and psychosis— but also for finding the truth, and ultimately was her choice of death.

Throughout her life, Woolf struggled, without success, to find meaning in her illness: on the one hand, an impediment, on the other, something she visualised as an essential part of who she was, and a necessary condition of her art. Her experiences informed her work, such as the character of Septimus Warren Smith in Mrs Dalloway (1925), who, like Woolf, was haunted by the dead, and ultimately takes his own life rather than be admitted to a sanatorium.

Leonard Woolf relates how during the 30 years they were married, they consulted many doctors in the Harley Street area, and although they were given a diagnosis of neurasthenia, he felt they had little understanding of the causes or nature. The proposed solution was simple—as long as she lived a quiet life without any physical or mental exertion, she was well. In contrast, any mental, emotional, or physical strain resulted in a reappearance of her symptoms, beginning with a headache, followed by insomnia and thoughts that started to race. Her remedy was simple: to retire to bed in a darkened room, following which the symptoms slowly subsided.

Modern scholars, including her nephew and biographer, Quentin Bell, have suggested her breakdowns and subsequent recurring depressive periods were influenced by the sexual abuse to which she and her sister Vanessa were subjected by their half-brothers George and Gerald Duckworth (which Woolf recalls in her autobiographical essays "A Sketch of the Past" and "22 Hyde Park Gate"). Biographers point out that when Stella died in 1897, there was no counterbalance to control George's predation, and his nighttime prowling. "22 Hyde Park Gate" ends with the sentence "The old ladies of Kensington and Belgravia never knew that George Duckworth was not only father and mother, brother and sister to those poor Stephen girls; he was their lover also."

It is likely that other factors also played a part. It has been suggested that they include genetic predisposition. Virginia's father, Leslie Stephen, suffered from depression, and her half-sister Laura was institutionalised. Many of Virginia's symptoms, including persistent headache, insomnia, irritability, and anxiety, resembled those of her father's. Another factor is the pressure she placed upon herself in her work; for instance, her breakdown of 1913 was at least partly triggered by the need to finish The Voyage Out.

Virginia herself hinted that her illness was related to how she saw the repressed position of women in society when she wrote A Room of One's Own. in a 1930 letter to Ethel Smyth:

As an experience, madness is terrific I can assure you, and not to be sniffed at; and in its lava I still find most of the things I write about. It shoots out of one everything shaped, final, not in mere driblets, as sanity does. And the six months—not three—that I lay in bed taught me a good deal about what is called oneself.

Thomas Caramagno and others, in discussing her illness, oppose the "neurotic-genius" way of looking at mental illness, where creativity and mental illness are conceptualised as linked rather than antithetical. Stephen Trombley describes Woolf as having a confrontational relationship with her doctors, and possibly being a woman who is a "victim of male medicine", referring to the lack of understanding, particularly at the time, about mental illness.

== Sexuality ==
The Bloomsbury Group held very progressive views of sexuality and rejected the austere strictness of Victorian society. The majority of its members were homosexual or bisexual.

Woolf had several affairs with women, the most notable being with Vita Sackville-West. The two women developed a deep connection; Vita was arguably one of the few people in Virginia's adult life that she was truly close to.

[Virginia Woolf] told Ethel that she only really loved three people: Leonard, Vanessa, and myself, which annoyed Ethel but pleased me.

— Vita Sackville-West's letter to husband Harold Nicolson, dated 28 September 1939

During their relationship, both women saw the peak of their literary careers, with the titular protagonist of Woolf's acclaimed Orlando: A Biography being inspired by Sackville-West. The pair remained lovers for a decade and stayed close friends for the rest of Woolf's life. Woolf had said to Sackville-West she disliked masculinity.

[Virginia Woolf] dislikes the possessiveness and love of domination in men. In fact, she dislikes the quality of masculinity says that women stimulate her imagination, by their grace & their art of life.

— Vita Sackville-West's diary, dated 26 September 1928

Among her other notable affairs were those with Sibyl Colefax, Lady Ottoline Morrell, and Mary Hutchinson. Some surmise that she fell in love with Madge Symonds, the wife of one of her uncles. Madge Symonds was described as one of Woolf's early loves in Sackville-West's diary. She also fell in love with Violet Dickinson, although there is some confusion as to whether the two consummated their relationship.

Virginia initially declined marriage proposals from her future husband, Leonard. She even went so far as to tell him that she was not physically attracted to him, but later declared that she did love him, and eventually agreed to marriage. Woolf preferred female lovers to male lovers and did not seem to be sexually attracted to men.

I sometimes think that if I married you, I could have everything—and then—is it the sexual side of it that comes between us? As I told you brutally the other day, I feel no physical attraction in you.

— Letter to Leonard from Virginia dated 1 May 1912

Leonard became the love of her life. Although their sexual relationship was questionable, they loved each other deeply and formed a strong and supportive marriage that led to the formation of their publishing house as well as several of her writings. Though Virginia had affairs with and attractions to women during their marriage, she and Leonard maintained a mutual love and respect.

== Work ==
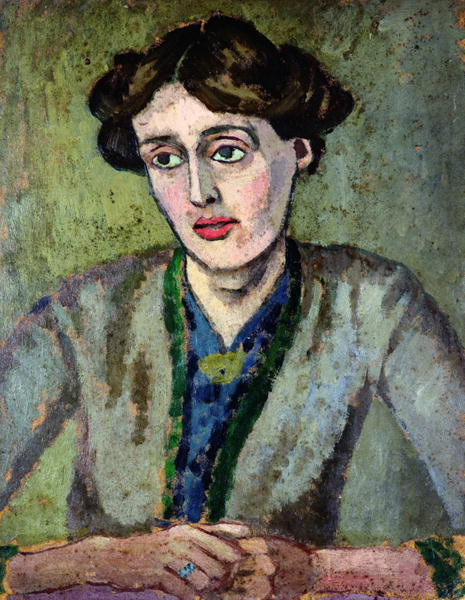
A portrait of Woolf by Roger Fry c. 1917

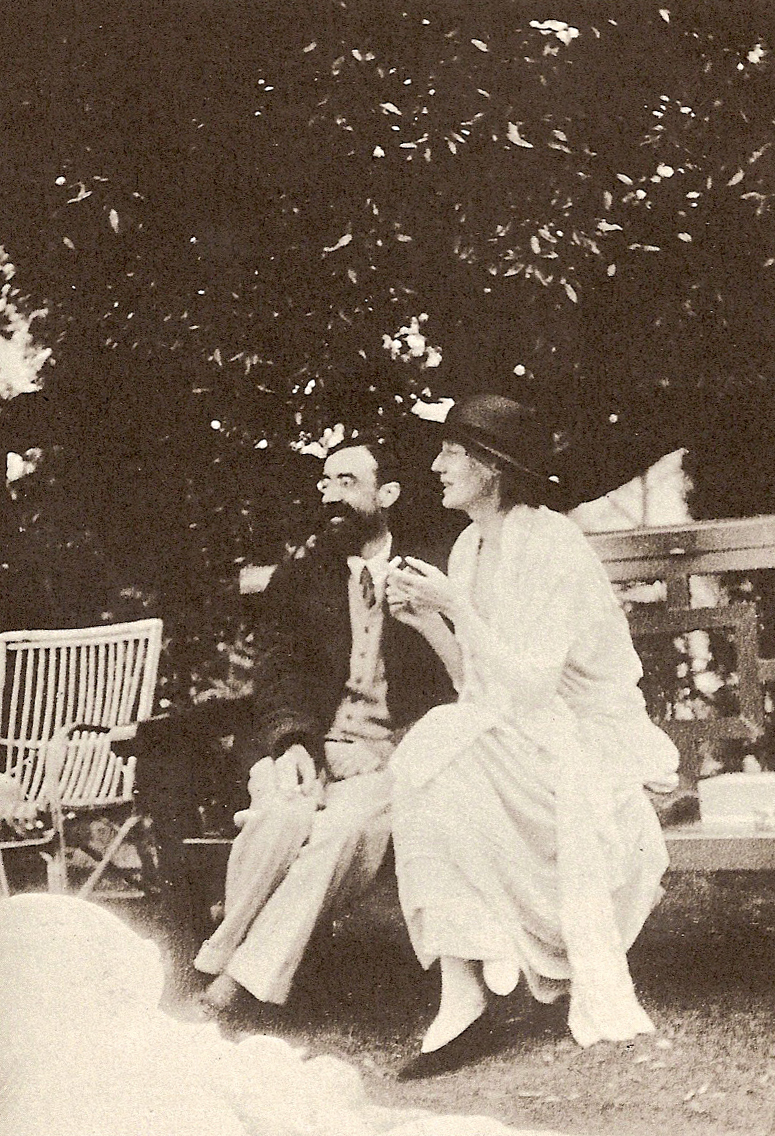
Lytton Strachey and Woolf at Garsington, 1923

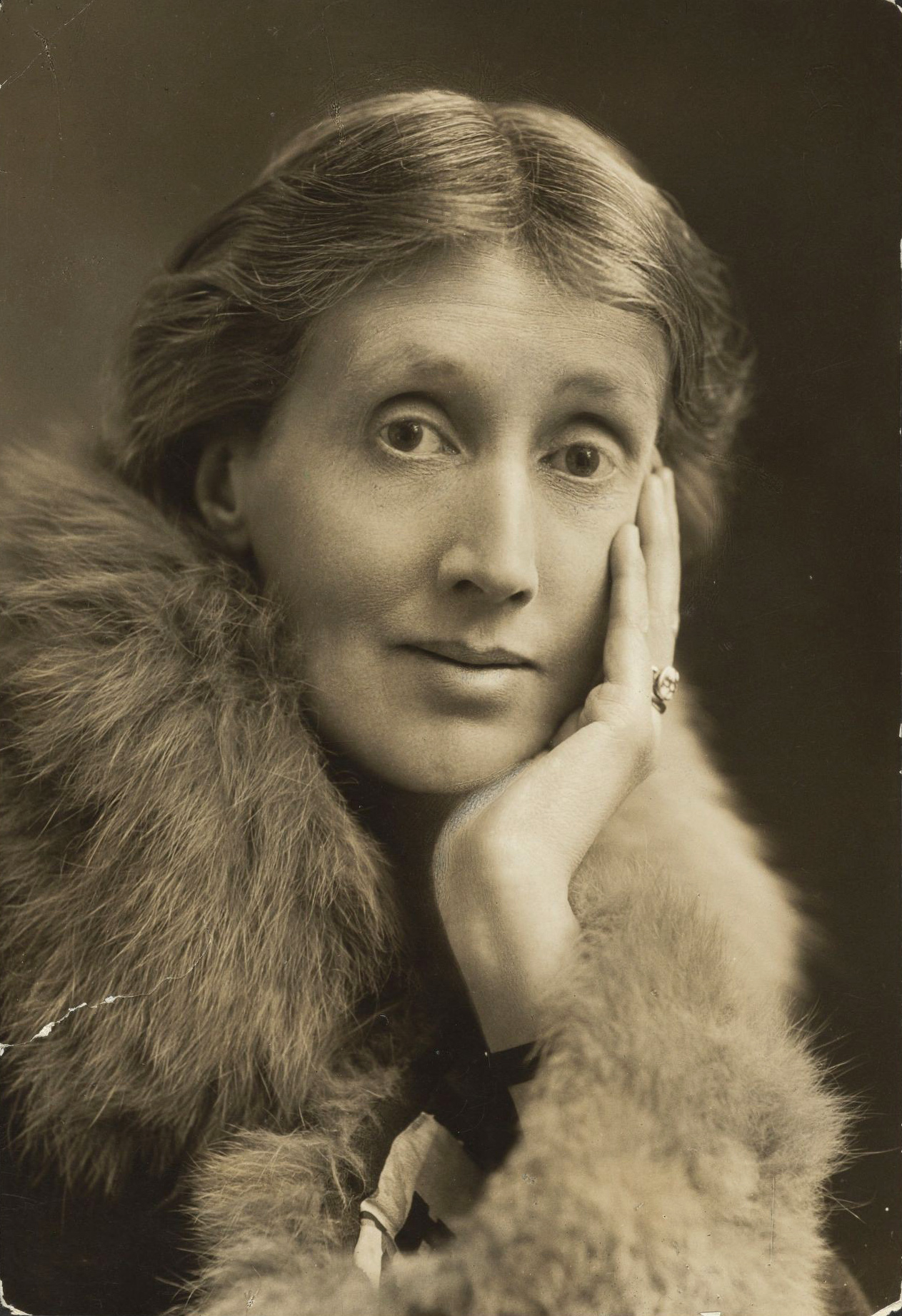
Woolf in 1927

Woolf is considered to be one of the most important 20th-century novelists. A modernist, she was one of the pioneers of using stream of consciousness as a narrative device, alongside contemporaries such as Marcel Proust, Dorothy Richardson and James Joyce. Woolf's reputation was at its greatest during the 1930s, but declined considerably following the Second World War. The growth of feminist criticism in the 1970s helped re-establish her reputation.

Virginia submitted her first article in 1890, to a competition in Tit-Bits. Although it was rejected, this shipboard romance by the eight-year-old would presage her first novel 25 years later, as would contributions to the Hyde Park News, such as the model letter "to show young people the right way to express what is in their hearts", a subtle commentary on her mother's legendary matchmaking. She transitioned from juvenilia to professional journalism in 1904 at the age of 22. Violet Dickinson introduced her to Kathleen Lyttelton, the editor of the Women's Supplement of The Guardian, a Church of England newspaper. Invited to submit a 1,500-word article, Virginia sent Lyttelton a review of William Dean Howells' The Son of Royal Langbirth and an essay about her visit to Haworth that year, Haworth, November 1904. The review was published anonymously on 4 December, and the essay on the 21st. In 1905, Woolf began writing for The Times Literary Supplement (TLS); in 2019, the TLS would publish a collection of her essays entitled Genius and Ink: Virginia Woolf on How to Read, which originally appeared anonymously, as did all their reviews.

Woolf went on to publish novels and essays as a public intellectual to both critical and popular acclaim. Much of her work was self-published through the Hogarth Press. "Virginia Woolf's peculiarities as a fiction writer have tended to obscure her central strength: she is arguably the major lyrical novelist in the English language. Her novels are highly experimental: a narrative, frequently uneventful and commonplace, is refracted—and sometimes almost dissolved—in the characters' receptive consciousness. Intense lyricism and stylistic virtuosity fuse to create a world overabundant with auditory and visual impressions." "The intensity of Virginia Woolf's poetic vision elevates the ordinary, sometimes banal settings"—often wartime environments—"of most of her novels."

Though at least one biography of Virginia Woolf appeared in her lifetime, the first authoritative study of her life was published in 1972 by her nephew Quentin Bell. Hermione Lee's 1996 biography Virginia Woolf provides a thorough and authoritative examination of Woolf's life and work, which she discussed in an interview in 1997. In 2001, Louise DeSalvo and Mitchell A. Leaska edited The Letters of Vita Sackville-West and Virginia Woolf. Julia Briggs's Virginia Woolf: An Inner Life (2005) focuses on Woolf's writing, including her novels and her commentary on the creative process, to illuminate her life. The sociologist Pierre Bourdieu also uses Woolf's literature to understand and analyse gender domination. Woolf biographer Gillian Gill notes that Woolf's traumatic experience of sexual abuse by her half-brothers during her childhood influenced her advocacy for the protection of vulnerable children from similar experiences. Biljana Dojčinović has discussed the issues surrounding translations of Woolf to Serbian as a "border-crossing".

=== Themes ===
Woolf's fiction has been studied for its insight into many themes including war, shell shock, witchcraft, and the role of social class in contemporary modern British society. In the postwar Mrs Dalloway (1925), Woolf addresses the moral dilemma of war and its effects and provides an authentic voice for soldiers returning from the First World War, suffering from shell shock, in the person of Septimus Smith. In A Room of One's Own (1929), Woolf equates historical accusations of witchcraft with creativity and genius among women "When, however, one reads of a witch being ducked, of a woman possessed by devils...then I think we are on the track of a lost novelist, a suppressed poet, of some mute and inglorious Jane Austen". Throughout her work Woolf tried to evaluate the degree to which her privileged background framed the lens through which she viewed class. She examined her own position as someone who would be considered an elitist snob but attacked the class structure of Britain as she found it. In her 1936 essay Am I a Snob? she examined her values and those of the privileged circle she existed in. She concluded she was, and subsequent critics and supporters have tried to deal with the dilemma of being both elite and a social critic.

The sea is a recurring motif in Woolf's work. Noting Woolf's early memory of listening to waves break in Cornwall, Katharine Smyth writes in The Paris Review that "the radiance [of] cresting water would be consecrated again and again in her writing, saturating not only essays, diaries, and letters but also Jacob's Room, The Waves, and To the Lighthouse." Patrizia A. Muscogiuri explains that "seascapes, sailing, diving and the sea itself are aspects of nature and of human beings' relationship with it which frequently inspired Virginia Woolf's writing." This trope is deeply embedded in her texts' structure and grammar; James Antoniou notes in Sydney Morning Herald how "Woolf made a virtue of the semicolon, the shape and function of which resembles the wave, her most famous motif."

Despite the considerable conceptual difficulties, given Woolf's idiosyncratic use of language, her works have been translated into over 50 languages. Some writers, such as the Belgian Marguerite Yourcenar, had rather tense encounters with her, while others, such as the Argentinian Jorge Luis Borges, produced versions that were highly controversial.

=== Drama ===
Virginia Woolf researched the life of her great-aunt, the photographer Julia Margaret Cameron, publishing her findings in an essay titled "Pattledom" (1925), and later in her introduction to her 1926 edition of Cameron's photographs. She had begun work on a play based on an episode in Cameron's life in 1923 but abandoned it. Finally, it was performed on 18 January 1935 at the studio of her sister, Vanessa Bell on Fitzroy Street in 1935. Woolf directed it herself, and the cast were mainly members of the Bloomsbury Group, including herself. Freshwater is a short three act comedy satirising the Victorian era, only performed once in Woolf's lifetime. Beneath the comedic elements, there is an exploration of both generational change and artistic freedom. Both Cameron and Woolf fought against the class and gender dynamics of Victorianism and the play shows links to both To the Lighthouse and A Room of One's Own that would follow.

=== Non-fiction ===
Woolf wrote a body of autobiographical work and more than 500 essays and reviews, some of which, like A Room of One's Own (1929) were book-length. Not all were published in her lifetime. Shortly after her death, Leonard Woolf produced an edition of unpublished essays, The Moment and other Essays, published by the Hogarth Press in 1947. Many of these were originally lectures she gave, and several more volumes of essays followed, such as The Captain's Death Bed: and other essays (1950).

==== A Room of One's Own ====
Among Woolf's non-fiction works, one of the best known is A Room of One's Own (1929), a book-length essay divided into six chapters. Considered a key work of feminist literary criticism, it was written following two lectures she delivered on "Women and Fiction" at Cambridge University the previous year. In it, she examines the historical disempowerment women have faced in many spheres, including social, educational and financial. One of her more famous dicta is contained within the book "A woman must have money and a room of her own if she is to write fiction". Much of her argument ("to show you how I arrived at this opinion about the room and the money") is developed through the "unsolved problems" of women and fiction writing to arrive at her conclusion, although she claimed that was only "an opinion upon one minor point". In doing so, she says a good deal about the nature of women and fiction, employing a quasi-fictional style as she examines where women writers failed because of lack of resources and opportunities, examining along the way the experiences of the Brontës, George Eliot and George Sand, as well as the fictional character of Shakespeare's sister, equipped with the same genius but not position. She contrasts these women who accepted a deferential status with Jane Austen, who wrote entirely as a woman.

=== Hogarth Press ===
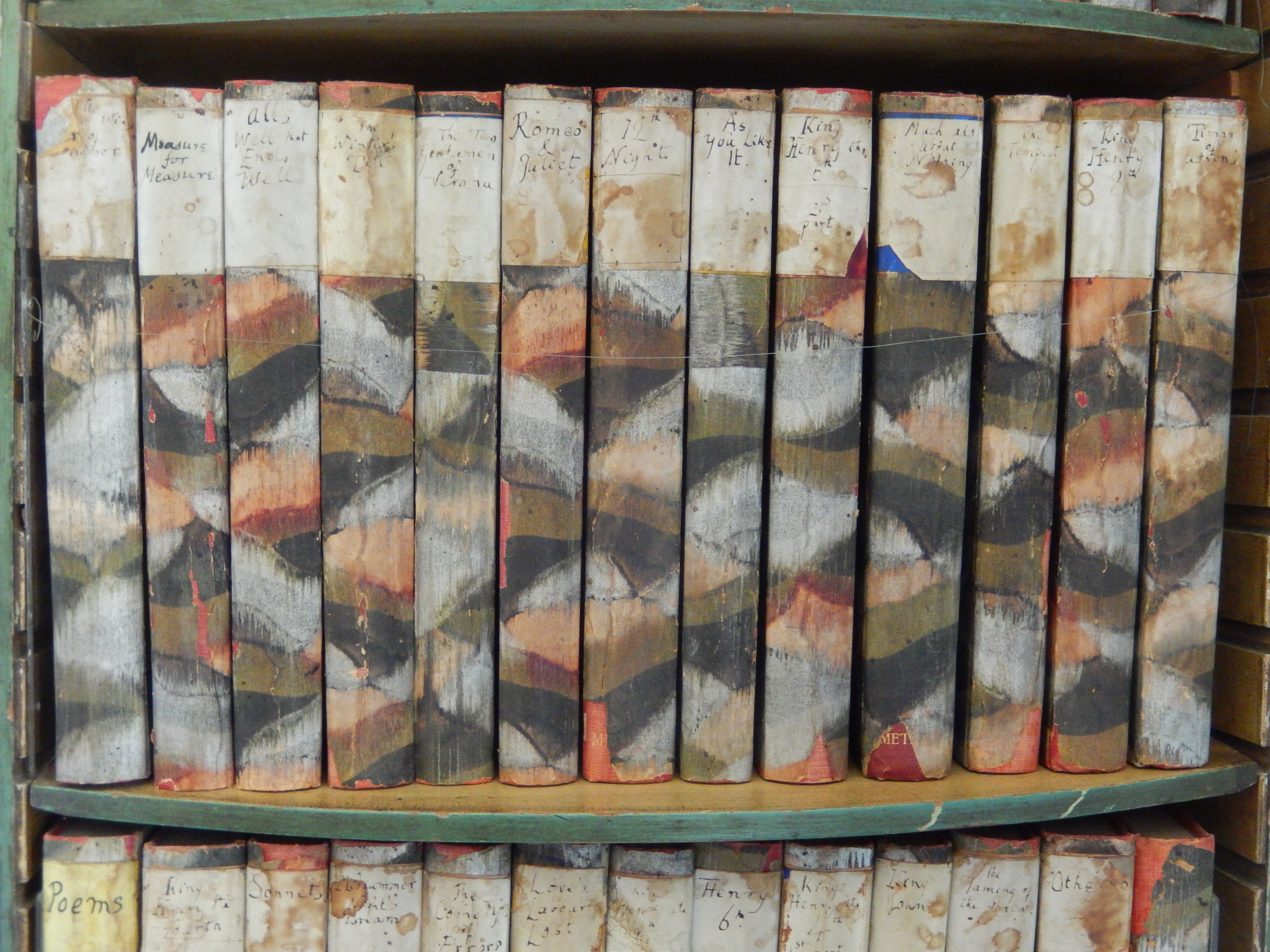
Shelf of Shakespeare plays hand-bound by Virginia Woolf in her bedroom at Monk's House (Note: It has been suggested that Woolf bound books to help cope with her depression, as is hinted at in her writing: "A great part of every day is not lived consciously. One walks, eats, sees things, deals with what has to be done; the broken vacuum cleaner; ... cooking dinner; bookbinding.")

Virginia had taken up book-binding as a pastime in October 1901, at the age of 19. The Woolfs had been discussing setting up a publishing house for some time – Leonard intended for it to give Virginia a rest from the strain of writing, and thereby help her fragile mental health. Additionally, publishing her works under their own imprint would save her from the stress of submitting her work to an external company, which had contributed to her breakdown during the process of publishing her first novel The Voyage Out. (Note: Her second novel, Night and Day (1919), was also published by Duckworth's, but Jacob's Room (1922) was published by Hogarth.) The Woolfs obtained their own hand-printing press in April 1917 and set it up on their dining-room table at Hogarth House, thus beginning the Hogarth Press.

The first publication was Two Stories in July 1917, consisting of "The Mark on the Wall" by Virginia Woolf (which has been described as "Woolf's first foray into modernism") and "Three Jews" by Leonard Woolf. The accompanying illustrations by Dora Carrington were a success, leading Virginia to remark that the press was "specially good at printing pictures, and we see that we must make a practice of always having pictures." The process took two and a half months with a production run of 150 copies. Other short stories followed, including Kew Gardens (1919) with a woodblock by Vanessa Bell as frontispiece. Subsequently, Bell added further illustrations, adorning each page of the text.

Unlike its contemporary small printers, who specialised in expensive artisanal reprints, the Woolfs concentrated on living avant-garde authors, and over the subsequent five years printed works by authors including Katherine Mansfield, T. S. Eliot, E. M. Forster, Clive Bell and Roger Fry. They also produced translations of Russian works with S. S. Koteliansky, and the first translation of the complete works of Sigmund Freud. They acquired a larger press in 1921 and began to sell directly to booksellers. In 1938 Virginia sold her share of the company to John Lehmann, who had started working for the Hogarth Press seven years previously. The Press eventually became Leonard's only source of income, but his association with it ended in 1946, after publishing 527 titles, and Hogarth is now an imprint of Penguin Random House.

The Press also produced explicitly political works. Pamphlets had fallen out of fashion due to the high production costs and low revenue, but the Hogarth Press produced several series on contemporary issues of international politics, challenging colonialism and critiquing Soviet Russia and Italian fascism. The Woolfs also published political fiction, including Turbott Wolfe (1926) by William Plomer and In a Province (1934) by Laurens van der Post, which concern South African racial policies and revolutionary movements respectively. Virginia Woolf saw a link between international politics and feminism, publishing a biography of Indian feminist activist Saroj Nalini Dutt and the memoirs of suffragette Elizabeth Robins. Scholar Ursula McTaggart argues that the Hogarth Press shaped and represented Woolf's later concept of an "Outsiders' Society", a non-organised group of women who would resist "the patriarchal fascism of war and nationalism" by exerting influence through private actions, as described in Three Guineas. In this view, the readers and authors form a loose network, with the Press providing the means to exchange ideas.

=== Influences ===
Sybil Oldfield examines Woolf's convinced pacifism, its sources and its expression in her life and works.

Michel Lackey argues that a major influence on Woolf, from 1912 onward, was Russian literature and Woolf adopted many of its aesthetic conventions. The style of Fyodor Dostoyevsky with his depiction of a fluid mind in operation helped to influence Woolf's writings about a "discontinuous writing process", though Woolf objected to Dostoyevsky's obsession with "psychological extremity" and the "tumultuous flux of emotions" in his characters together with his right-wing, monarchist politics as Dostoyevsky was an ardent supporter of the autocracy of the Russian Empire. In contrast to her objections to Dostoyevsky's "exaggerated emotional pitch", Woolf found much to admire in the work of Anton Chekhov and Leo Tolstoy. Woolf admired Chekhov for his stories of ordinary people living their lives, doing banal things and plots that had no neat endings. From Tolstoy, Woolf drew lessons about how a novelist should depict a character's psychological state and the interior tension within. Lackey notes that, from Ivan Turgenev, Woolf drew the lessons that there are multiple "I's" when writing a novel, and the novelist needed to balance those multiple versions of him- or herself to balance the "mundane facts" of a story vs. the writer's overarching vision, which required a "total passion" for art.

The American writer Henry David Thoreau also influenced Woolf. In a 1917 essay, she praised Thoreau for his statement "The millions are awake enough for physical labor, but only one in hundreds of millions is awake enough to a poetic or divine life. To be awake is to be alive." They both aimed to capture "the moment"––as Walter Pater says, "to burn always with this hard, gem-like flame." Woolf praised Thoreau for his "simplicity" in finding "a way for setting free the delicate and complicated machinery of the soul". Like Thoreau, Woolf believed that it was silence that set the mind free to really contemplate and understand the world. Both authors believed in a certain transcendental, mystical approach to life and writing, where even banal things could be capable of generating deep emotions if one had enough silence and the presence of mind to appreciate them. Woolf and Thoreau were both concerned with the difficulty of human relationships in the modern age.

Woolf's preface to Orlando credits Daniel Defoe, Sir Thomas Browne, Laurence Sterne, Sir Walter Scott, Lord Macaulay, Emily Brontë, Thomas de Quincey, and Walter Pater as influences. Among her contemporaries, Woolf was influenced by Marcel Proust, writing to Roger Fry, "Oh if I could write like that!"

==== Virginia Woolf and her mother ====
The intense scrutiny of Virginia Woolf's literary output has led to speculation as to her mother's influence, including psychoanalytic studies of mother and daughter. Her memories of her mother are memories of an obsession, starting with her first major breakdown on her mother's death in 1895, the loss having a profound lifelong effect. In many ways, her mother's profound influence on Virginia Woolf is conveyed in the latter's recollections, "there she is; beautiful, emphatic ... closer than any of the living are, lighting our random lives as with a burning torch, infinitely noble and delightful to her children".

Woolf's understanding of her mother and family evolved considerably between 1907 and 1940, in which the somewhat distant, yet revered figure, becomes more nuanced and complete. She described her mother as an "invisible presence" in her life, and Ellen Rosenman argues that the mother-daughter relationship is a constant in Woolf's writing. She describes how Woolf's modernism needs to be viewed in relationship to her ambivalence towards her Victorian mother, the centre of the former's female identity, and her voyage to her own sense of autonomy. To Woolf, "Saint Julia" was both a martyr whose perfectionism was intimidating and a source of deprivation, by her absences real and virtual and premature death. Julia's influence and memory pervade Woolf's life and work. "She has haunted me", she wrote.

=== Historical feminism ===
According to the 2007 book Feminism: From Mary Wollstonecraft to Betty Friedan by Bhaskar A. Shukla, "Recently, studies of Virginia Woolf have focused on feminist and lesbian themes in her work, such as in the 1997 collection of critical essays, Virginia Woolf: Lesbian Readings, edited by Eileen Barrett and Patricia Cramer." In 1928, Woolf took a grassroots approach to informing and inspiring feminism. She addressed undergraduate women at the ODTAA Society at Girton College, Cambridge, and the Arts Society at Newnham College, with two papers that eventually became A Room of One's Own (1929).

Woolf's best-known nonfiction works, A Room of One's Own (1929) and Three Guineas (1938), examine the difficulties that female writers and intellectuals faced because men held disproportionate legal and economic power, as well as the future of women in education and society. In The Second Sex (1949), Simone de Beauvoir counts, of all women who ever lived, only three female writers—Emily Brontë, Woolf and "sometimes" Katherine Mansfield—who have explored "the given".

== Views ==
Woolf was outspoken on many topics considered controversial, some of which are now considered progressive, others regressive. She was an ardent feminist at a time when women's rights were barely recognised, and anti-colonialist, anti-imperialist, anti-militarist and a pacifist when chauvinism was popular. On the other hand, she has been criticised for her views on class and race in her private writings and published works. As with many of her contemporaries, some of her writing is now considered offensive. As a result, she is considered polarising, a revolutionary feminist and socialist hero or a purveyor of hate speech.

Works such as A Room of One's Own (1929) and Three Guineas (1938) are frequently taught as icons of feminist literature in courses that would be very critical of some of her views expressed elsewhere. She has also been the recipient of considerable homophobic and misogynist criticism.

=== Humanist views ===
Woolf was born into a non-religious family and is regarded, along with fellow members of the Bloomsbury group E. M. Forster and G. E. Moore, as a humanist. Both her parents were prominent agnostic atheists although a significant influence was her aunt Caroline Stephen. Caroline was a convert to Quakerism, the Religious Society of Friends, and a strong English exponent for its peace testimony in 1890. Her father, Leslie Stephen, had become famous in polite society for his writings which expressed and publicised reasons to doubt the veracity of religion and abhorred military service. Stephen was also President of the West London Ethical Society, an early humanist organisation, and helped to found the Union of Ethical Societies in 1896. Woolf's mother, Julia Stephen, wrote the book Agnostic Women (1880), which argued that agnosticism (defined here as something more like atheism) could be a highly moral approach to life.

Woolf was a critic of Christianity. In a letter to Ethel Smyth, she scathingly denounced religion, seeing it as self-righteous "egotism" and writing, "my Jew [Leonard] has more religion in one toenail—more human love, in one hair". Woolf wrote in her private letters that she thought of herself as an atheist.

She thought there were no Gods; no one was to blame; and so she evolved this atheist's religion of doing good for the sake of goodness.

— Woolf characterises Clarissa Dalloway, the title character of Mrs Dalloway

=== Controversies ===
Hermione Lee cites a number of extracts from Woolf's writings that many, including Lee, would consider offensive, and these criticisms can be traced back as far as those of Wyndham Lewis and Q. D. Leavis in the 1920s and 1930s. Other authors provide more nuanced contextual interpretations and stress the complexity of her character and the apparent inherent contradictions in analysing her apparent flaws. She could certainly be off-hand, rude and even cruel in her dealings with other authors, translators and biographers, such as her treatment of Ruth Gruber. Some authors, including David Daiches, Brenda Silver, Alison Light and other postcolonial feminists, dismiss her (and modernist authors in general) as privileged, elitist, classist, racist, and antisemitic.

Woolf's tendentious expressions, including prejudicial feelings against disabled people, have often been the topic of academic criticism:

The first quotation is from a diary entry of September 1920 and runs: "The fact is the lower classes are detestable." The remainder follow the first in reproducing stereotypes standard to upper-class and upper-middle class life in the early 20th century: "imbeciles should certainly be killed"; "Jews" are greasy; a "crowd" is both an ontological "mass" and is, again, "detestable"; "Germans" are akin to vermin; some "baboon faced intellectuals" mix with "sad green dressed negroes and negresses, looking like chimpanzees" at a peace conference; Kensington High St. revolts one's stomach with its innumerable "women of incredible mediocrity, drab as dishwater".

=== Antisemitism ===
Woolf has often been accused of antisemitism. Despite being happily married to an irreligious Jewish man (Leonard Woolf) who had no connection with or knowledge of his people, she generally characterised Jewish characters with negative stereotypes. For instance, she described some of the Jewish characters in her work in terms that suggested they were physically repulsive or dirty. She also expressed derogatory views in private, writing in a 1930 letter to Ethyl Smith, "How I hated marrying a Jew—how I hated their nasal voices and their oriental jewellery, and their noses and their wattles—what a snob I was: for they have immense vitality, and I think I like that quality best of all" (Letter to Ethel Smyth, 1930).

While on a cruise to Portugal, she protested at finding "a great many Portuguese Jews on board, and other repulsive objects, but we keep clear of them". She wrote in her diary: "I do not like the Jewish voice; I do not like the Jewish laugh." Her 1938 short story, written during Hitler's rule, "The Duchess and the Jeweller" (originally titled "The Duchess and the Jew") has been considered antisemitic.

Some believe that Woolf and her husband came to despise and fear the 1930s' fascism and antisemitism. Her 1938 book Three Guineas was an indictment of fascism and what Woolf called a recurring propensity among patriarchal societies to enforce repressive societal mores by violence. But "The Duchess and the Jeweller" was so deeply hateful in its depiction of Jews that Harper's Bazaar asked her to modify it before publication; she reluctantly complied.

== Legacy ==
Memorials

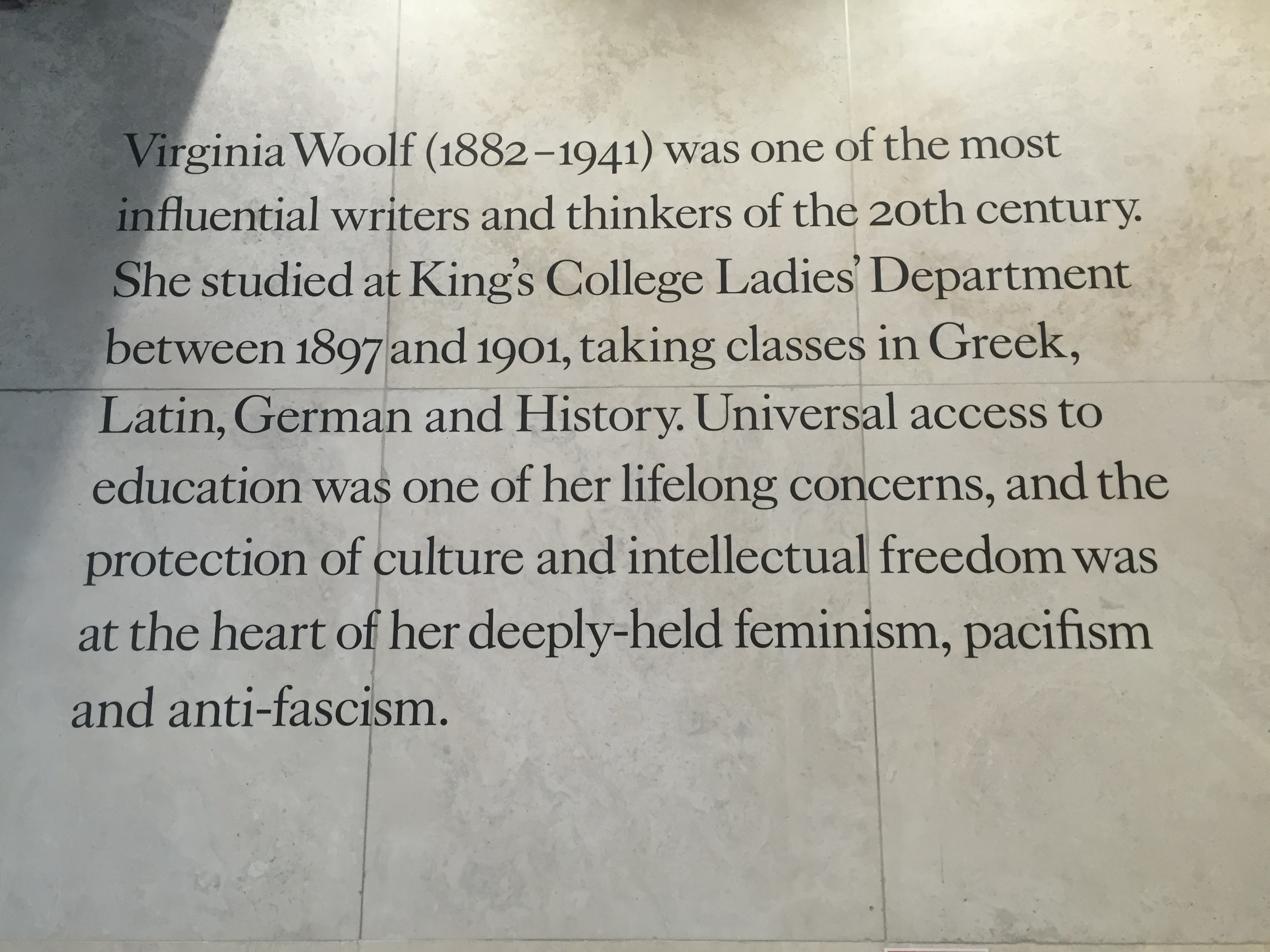
Plaque honouring Virginia Woolf on the Virginia Woolf Building at King's College London, Kingsway

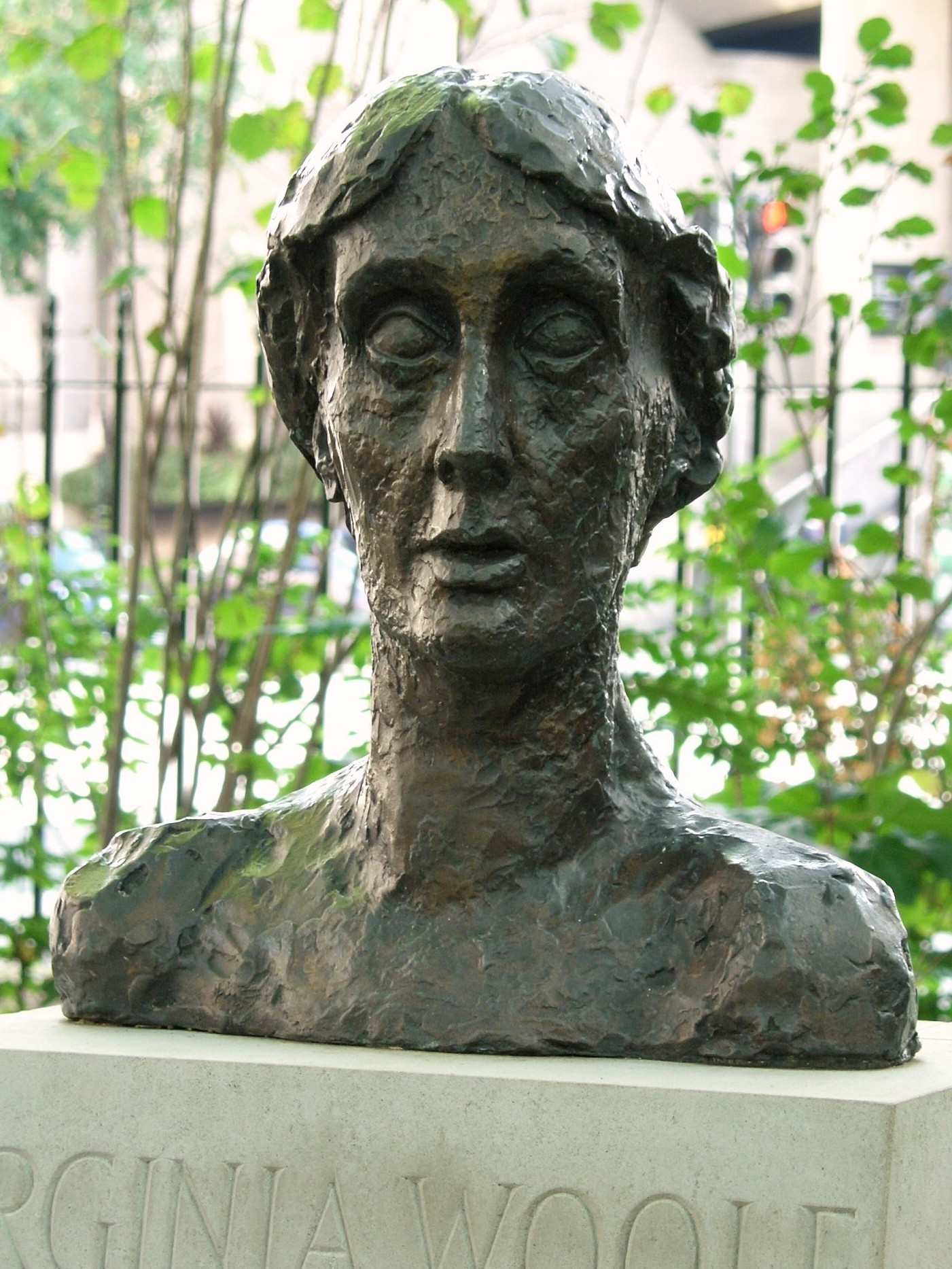
Woolf's bust in Tavistock Square, London, by Stephen Tomlin, 1931. Erected by the Virginia Woolf Society of Great Britain, 2004.

Woolf is known for her contributions to 20th-century literature and her essays, as well as the influence she has had on literary, particularly feminist criticism. Many authors have said their work was influenced by her, including Margaret Atwood, Michael Cunningham, (Note: "Like my hero Virginia Woolf, I do lack confidence. I always find that the novel I'm finishing, even if it's turned out fairly well, is not the novel I had in my mind.") Gabriel García Márquez, (Note: "after having read Ulysses in English as well as a very good French translation, I can see that the original Spanish translation was very bad. But I did learn something that was to be very useful to me in my future writing—the technique of the interior monologue. I later found this in Virginia Woolf, and I like the way she uses it better than Joyce.") and Toni Morrison. (Note: "I wrote on Woolf and Faulkner. I read a lot of Faulkner then. You might not know this, but in the '50s, American literature was new. It was renegade. English literature was English. So there were these avant-garde professors making American literature a big deal. That tickles me now.") Her iconic image is instantly recognisable from the portrait of her aged 20 by George Charles Beresford (at the top of this page) to the Beck and Macgregor portrait in her mother's dress in Vogue at 44 (see Fry (1913)) or Man Ray's cover of Time magazine (see Ray (1937)) at 55. More postcards of Woolf are sold by London's National Portrait Gallery than of any other person. Her image is ubiquitous and can be found on products ranging from tea towels to T-shirts.

Woolf is studied around the world, with organisations devoted to her, such as the Virginia Woolf Society of Great Britain, and The Virginia Woolf Society of Japan. In addition, trusts—such as the Asham Trust—encouraged writers in her honour.

In 2019, Time created 89 new covers to celebrate women of the year starting from 1920; it chose Woolf for 1929.

In January 2025 Sophie Oliver, a lecturer of modernism at the University of Liverpool, discovered two previously unknown poems by Woolf, at the Harry Ransom Center at the University of Texas at Austin. Oliver estimated the date of the poems, which reveal "a different shade" to Woolf, as sometime after March 1927.

=== Monuments and memorials ===
In 2013, Woolf was honoured by her alma mater King's College London with the opening of the Virginia Woolf Building on Kingsway, together with an exhibit depicting her accompanied by the quotation "London itself perpetually attracts, stimulates, gives me a play & a story & a poem" from her 1926 diary. The University of Kent also named a college after her—Woolf College, which was built in 2008.

Busts of Woolf have been erected at her home in Rodmell, Sussex, and at Tavistock Square, London, where she lived between 1924 and 1939. She is also honoured at Tavistock Square by the Woolf & Whistle, a bar near where her house once stood.

In 2014, she was one of the inaugural honorees in the Rainbow Honor Walk, a walk of fame in San Francisco's Castro neighbourhood noting LGBTQ people who have "made significant contributions in their fields".

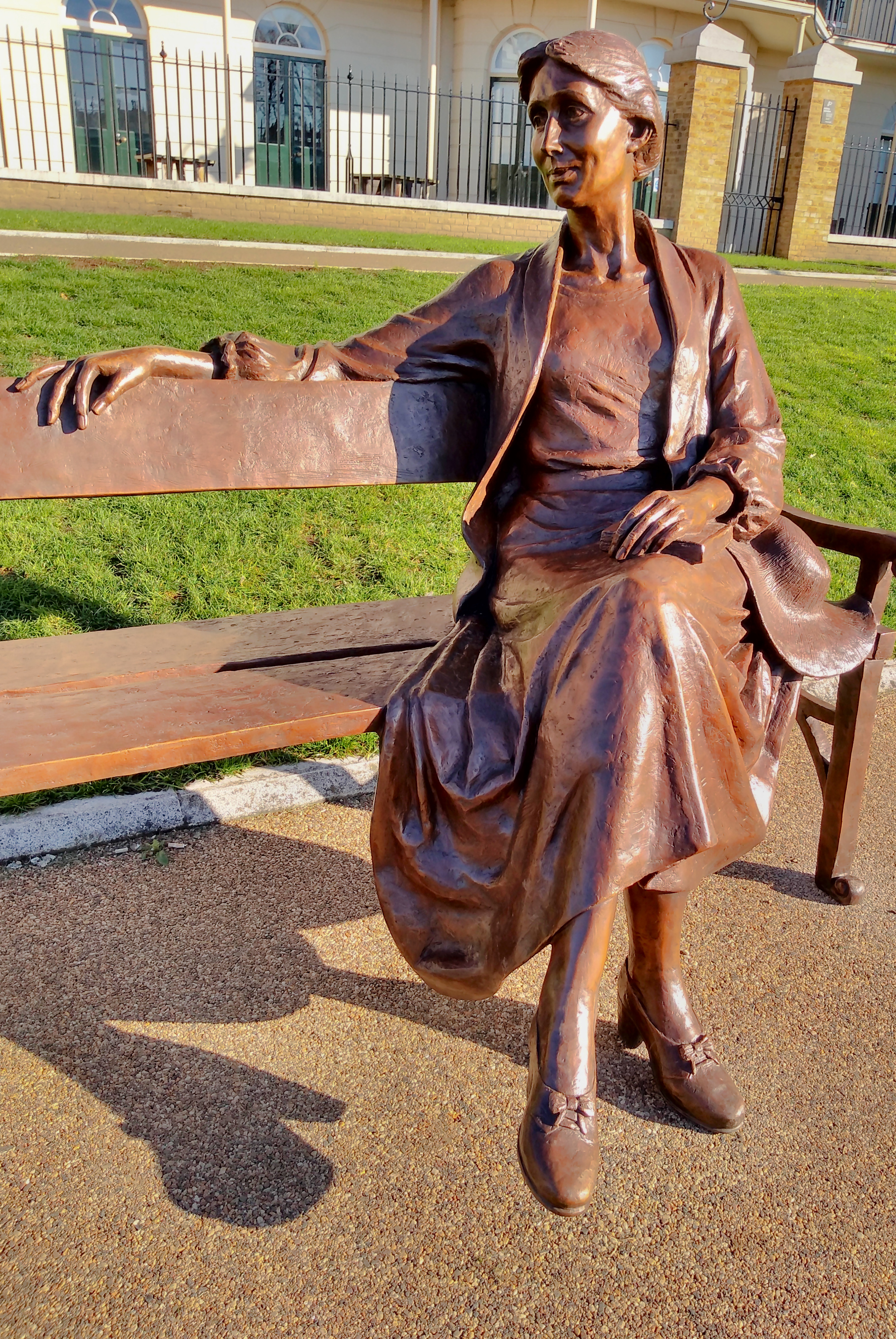
Statue of Virginia Woolf in Richmond-upon-Thames created by Laury Dizengremel

A campaign was launched in 2018 to erect a statue of Woolf in Richmond-upon-Thames, where she lived for 10 years. In November 2022 the statue, created by sculptor Laury Dizengremel, was unveiled. It depicts Woolf on a bench overlooking the River Thames and is the first full-size statue of Woolf.

=== Portrayals ===
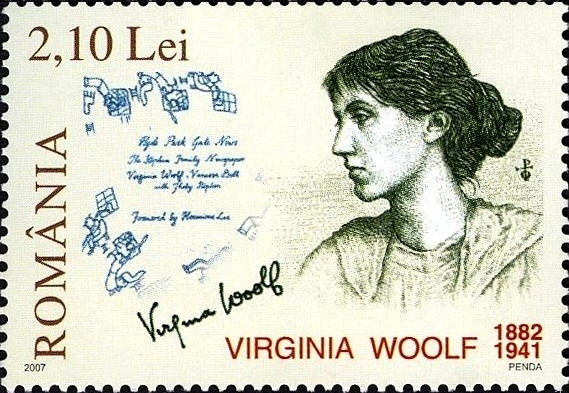
Virginia Woolf on a 2007 Romanian postage stamp

- Michael Cunningham's 1998 Pulitzer Prize-winning novel The Hours focused on three generations of women affected by Woolf's novel Mrs Dalloway. In 2002, a film version of the novel was released, starring Nicole Kidman as Woolf. Kidman won the Academy Award for Best Actress for her performance.
- Susan Sellers's novel Vanessa and Virginia (2008) explores the close sibling relationship between Woolf and her sister, Vanessa Bell. It was adapted for the stage by Elizabeth Wright in 2010 and first performed by Moving Stories Theatre Company.
- Priya Parmar's 2014 novel Vanessa and Her Sister also examined the Stephen sisters' relationship during the early years of their association with what became known as the Bloomsbury Group.
- In the 2014 novel The House at the End of Hope Street, Woolf is featured as one of the women who has lived in the titular house.
- Virginia is portrayed by both Lydia Leonard and Catherine McCormack in the BBC's three-part drama series Life in Squares (2015).
- The 2018 film Vita and Virginia depicts the relationship between Vita Sackville-West and Woolf, portrayed by Gemma Arterton and Elizabeth Debicki respectively.
- In 2022, an opera of The Hours by composer Kevin Puts and librettist Greg Pierce premiered at the Metropolitan Opera to acclaim.
- In 2026, the West End play The Standard of Living by James Graham about John Maynard Keynes featured Woolf as part of the Bloomsbury Group.

=== Adaptations ===
- Sally Potter adapted Orlando (1928) for the screen in 1992, as a film also called Orlando, starring Tilda Swinton.
- Woolf's play Freshwater (1935) is the basis for a 1994 chamber opera, Freshwater, by Andy Vores.
- Septimus and Clarissa, a stage adaptation of Mrs Dalloway, was created and produced by the New York-based ensemble Ripe Time in 2011. It was adapted by Ellen McLaughlin.
- In 2014, artist Kabe Wilson produced a novella and artwork entitled Of One Woman Or So, created over five years by rearranging the words of Woolf's 1929 essay A Room of One's Own.
- Woolf Works, a contemporary ballet inspired by Woolf's novels, letters, essays and diaries, choreographed by Wayne McGregor, premiered in May 2015.
- The final segment of the 2018 anthology film London Unplugged is adapted from Woolf's short story "Kew Gardens".

== Selected works ==
=== Novels ===
- The Voyage Out (1915)
- Night and Day (1919)
- Jacob's Room (1922)
- Mrs Dalloway (1925)
- To the Lighthouse (1927)
- Orlando: A Biography (1928)
- The Waves (1931)
- The Years (1937)
- Between the Acts (1941)

Woolf's most notable other works include the following:

=== Essays and essay collections ===
- "Mr. Bennett and Mrs. Brown" (1924)
- "Modern Fiction" (1925)
- The Common Reader (1925)
- "The Art of Fiction" (1927)
- "The New Biography" (1927)
- A Room of One's Own (1929)
- The Common Reader: Second Series (1932)
- Three Guineas (1938)

=== Other ===
- "Kew Gardens" (1919), short story
- Flush: A Biography (1933)
- Freshwater (1935)

== Bibliography ==
=== Books and theses ===
- Batchelor, John, ed. (1995). The Art of Literary Biography. Clarendon Press. ISBN 978-0-19-818289-4. Archived from the original on 11 June 2020.
- Beauvoir, Simone de (2015) [1949]. The Second Sex (Vintage Feminism Short ed.). Random House. ISBN 978-1-4735-2191-9. Archived from the original on 11 June 2020. see also The Second Sex
- Eagle, Dorothy S.; Carnell, Hilary, eds. (1981) [1977]. The Oxford Illustrated Literary Guide to Great Britain and Ireland (2nd ed.). Oxford University Press. ISBN 0198691254. OL 4116730M.
- Hirsch, Marianne (1989). The Mother / Daughter Plot: Narrative, Psychoanalysis, Feminism. Indiana University Press. ISBN 0-253-11575-2. Archived from the original on 11 June 2020.
- Lowe, Gill, ed. (2005). Hyde Park Gate News: The Stephen Family Newspaper. London: Hesperus Press. OL 17189258M.
- Parmar, Priya (2015). Vanessa and Her Sister. Doubleday Canada. ISBN 978-0-385-68134-6. Archived from the original on 11 June 2020.
- Richardson, Dorothy (2014) [1915]. Ross, Stephen; Thomson, Tara (eds.). Pointed Roofs. Broadview Press. ISBN 978-1-77048-538-9. Archived from the original on 12 June 2020.
- Shukla, Bhaskar A. (2007). Feminism:From Mary Wollstonecraft To Betty Friedan. Sarup & Sons. ISBN 978-81-7625-754-1. Archived from the original on 12 June 2020.
- van Praag, Menna (2014). The house at the end of Hope Street: a novel. New York: Penguin Books. ISBN 978-0143124948. OCLC 852829959.
- Wilson, Scott (2016). Resting Places: The Burial Sites of More Than 14,000 Famous Persons (3rd ed.). McFarland & Company. ISBN 978-1-4766-2599-7. Archived from the original on 2 October 2020.
- Woolf, Virginia (1977). Leaska, Mitchell A. (ed.). The Pargiters: The Novel-Essay Portion of The Years. New York: Harcourt Brace Jovanovich. ISBN 0-15-671380-2.

==== Biography: Virginia Woolf ====
- Bell, Quentin (1972). Virginia Woolf: A Biography. Harcourt Brace Jovanovich. ISBN 978-0-15-693580-7. OL 26650778M.
- Briggs, Julia (2006a). Virginia Woolf: An Inner Life. Harcourt. ISBN 978-0-15-603229-2. OL 7350841M. Archived from the original on 11 June 2020.
- Curtis, Vanessa (2002b). Virginia Woolf's Women. University of Wisconsin Press. ISBN 978-0-299-18340-0. Archived from the original on 11 June 2020.
- Curtis, Anthony (2006). Virginia Woolf: Bloomsbury & Beyond. Haus Publishing. ISBN 978-1-904950-23-3. Archived from the original on 11 June 2020.
- Forrester, Viviane (2015). Virginia Woolf: A Portrait. Columbia University Press. ISBN 978-0-231-53512-0. Archived from the original on 12 June 2020.
- Gordon, Lyndall (1984). Virginia Woolf: A Writer's Life. Oxford University Press. ISBN 978-0-19-811723-0. Archived from the original on 11 June 2020.
- Harris, Alexandra (2011). Virginia Woolf. New York: Thames & Hudson. ISBN 9780500515921. OL 25269825M.
- Humm, Maggie (2006). Snapshots of Bloomsbury: The Private Lives of Virginia Woolf and Vanessa Bell. Rutgers University Press. ISBN 978-0-8135-3706-1. Archived from the original on 11 June 2020.
- Lee, Hermione (1997a) [1996]. Virginia Woolf. Alfred A. Knopf. ISBN 0-679-44707-5. OL 708461M.
- Licence, Amy (2015). Living in Squares, Loving in Triangles: The Lives and Loves of Virginia Woolf and the Bloomsbury Group. Amberley Publishing Limited. ISBN 978-1-4456-4579-7. Archived from the original on 11 June 2020.
- Liukkonen, Petri (2008). "Virginia Woolf (1882–1941)". Books and Writers. Finland: Kuusankoski Public Library. Archived from the original on 28 January 2015.
- Pearce, Brian Louis (2007). Virginia Woolf and the Bloomsbury Group in Twickenham. Borough of Twickenham Local History Society. p. 7. ISBN 978-0-903341-80-6. Archived from the original on 11 June 2020.
- Rose, Phyllis (1979). Woman of Letters: A Life of Virginia Woolf. Oxford University Press. ISBN 978-0-19-502621-4. Archived from the original on 11 June 2020.
- Rosenman, Ellen Bayuk (1986). The Invisible Presence: Virginia Woolf and the Mother-daughter Relationship. Louisiana State University Press. ISBN 978-0-8071-1290-8.
- Silver, Brenda R. (1999). Virginia Woolf Icon. University of Chicago Press. ISBN 978-0-226-75746-9. Archived from the original on 11 June 2020.
- Snaith, Anna, ed. (2007). Palgrave Advances in Virginia Woolf Studies. Palgrave Macmillan UK. ISBN 978-0-230-20604-5. Archived from the original on 12 June 2020.
- Squier, Susan Merrill (1985). Virginia Woolf and London: The Sexual Politics of the City. University of North Carolina Press. ISBN 978-1-4696-3991-8. Archived from the original on 11 June 2020.
- Streufert, Mary J. (8 June 1988). Measures of reality: the religious life of Virginia Woolf (MA thesis). Oregon State University. Archived from the original on 27 January 2018.
- Wright, E. H. (2011). Brief Lives: Virginia Woolf. London: Hesperus Press. OL 11907594M.

===== Mental health =====
- Caramagno, Thomas C. (1992). The Flight of the Mind: Virginia Woolf's Art and Manic-Depressive Illness. University of California Press. ISBN 978-0-520-93512-9. Archived from the original on 11 June 2020. (summary)
- Jamison, Kay Redfield (1996). Touched With Fire. Simon and Schuster. ISBN 978-1-4391-0663-1. Archived from the original on 11 June 2020. see also Touched with Fire
- Meyer, Robert G.; Osborne, Yvonne Hardaway (1982). Case Studies in Abnormal Behavior. Allyn and Bacon. ISBN 978-0-205-07744-1.
- Montross, Christine (2014). Falling into the Fire. Oneworld Publications. ISBN 978-1-78074-367-7. Archived from the original on 11 June 2020.
- Trombley, Stephen (October 1980). Virginia Woolf and her doctors (PDF) (PhD thesis). University of Nottingham. Archived (PDF) from the original on 18 February 2018.
- Trombley, Stephen (1981). All that Summer She was Mad: Virginia Woolf and Her Doctors. London: Junction Books. ISBN 978-0-86245-039-7.

==== Biography: Other ====
- Bell, Vanessa (1993). Marler, Regina (ed.). The Selected Letters of Vanessa Bell. Pantheon Books. ISBN 978-0-679-41939-6. Archived from the original on 12 June 2020.
  - Marler, Regina. "Biographical introduction". In Bell (1993), pp. xvii–xviii.
- Garnett, Angelica (2011) [1985]. Deceived With Kindness. Random House. ISBN 978-1-4464-7525-6. Archived from the original on 11 June 2020.
- Moggridge, Donald Edward (1992). Maynard Keynes: An Economist's Biography. Psychology Press. ISBN 978-0-415-05141-5. Archived from the original on 11 June 2020.
- Woolf, Leonard (1975) [1964]. Beginning Again: An Autobiography of the Years 1911 to 1918. Harcourt Brace Jovanovich. ISBN 978-0-15-611680-0. Archived from the original on 11 June 2020.

==== Literary commentary ====
- Alexander, Christine; McMaster, Juliet, eds. (2005). The Child Writer from Austen to Woolf. Cambridge University Press. ISBN 978-0-521-81293-1. Archived from the original on 12 June 2020.
- Beja, Morris (1985). Critical essays on Virginia Woolf. G. K. Hall. ISBN 978-0-8161-8753-9. Archived from the original on 11 June 2020.
- Berman, Jessica, ed. (2016). A Companion to Virginia Woolf. Wiley. ISBN 978-1-118-45790-0. Archived from the original on 11 June 2020.
- Ellis, Steve (2007). Virginia Woolf and the Victorians. Cambridge University Press. ISBN 978-1-139-46896-1. Archived from the original on 12 June 2020. (additional excerpts)
- Goldman, Jane (2001). The Feminist Aesthetics of Virginia Woolf: Modernism, Post-Impressionism, and the Politics of the Visual. Cambridge University Press. ISBN 978-0-521-79458-9. Archived from the original on 12 June 2020.
- Hague, Angela (2003). Fiction, Intuition, & Creativity: Studies in Brontë, James, Woolf, and Lessing. CUA Press. ISBN 978-0-8132-1314-9. Archived from the original on 12 June 2020.
- Koutsantoni, Dr Katerina (2013). Virginia Woolf's Common Reader. Ashgate Publishing, Ltd. ISBN 978-1-4094-7526-2. Archived from the original on 11 June 2020.
- Latham, Sean (2003). "Am I a Snob?": Modernism and the Novel. Cornell University Press. ISBN 0-8014-8841-9. Archived from the original on 11 June 2020.
- Madden, Mary C (31 March 2006). Virginia Woolf and the persistent question of class: The protean nature of class and self (PhD thesis). Department of English, University of South Florida. Archived from the original on 15 March 2018.
- Rahn, Josh (2018). "Modernism". The Literature Network. Jalic.
- Randall, Bryony; Goldman, Jane, eds. (2012). Virginia Woolf in Context. Cambridge University Press. ISBN 978-1-107-00361-3. Archived from the original on 12 June 2020.
- Sim, Lorraine (2016). "Introduction" (PDF). Virginia Woolf: The Patterns of Ordinary Experience. Routledge. pp. 1–26. ISBN 978-1-317-00160-7. Archived from the original on 11 June 2020.
- Simpson, Kathryn (2016). Woolf: A Guide for the Perplexed. Bloomsbury Publishing. ISBN 978-1-4725-9068-8. Archived from the original on 11 June 2020.
- Snodgrass, Chris (2015). "Introduction: Virginia Woolf (1882‒1941)" (PDF) (Course materials). Department of English, University of Florida. Archived from the original (PDF) on 16 March 2018.
- Zamith, Maria Cândida; Flora, Luísa, eds. (2007). Virginia Woolf: Three Centenary Celebrations. Universidade do Porto. ISBN 978-972-8932-23-7. Archived from the original on 11 June 2020. additional excerpt Archived 19 February 2018 at the Wayback Machine

==== Bloomsbury ====
- Rosenbaum, S.P. (2016) [1987]. Victorian Bloomsbury: Volume 1: The Early Literary History of the Bloomsbury Group. Palgrave Macmillan. ISBN 978-1-349-13368-0. Archived from the original on 11 June 2020. (additional excerpts)
- Rosenbaum, S.; Haule, J. (2014). The Bloomsbury Group Memoir Club. Palgrave Macmillan UK. ISBN 978-1-137-36036-6. Archived from the original on 11 June 2020.
- Todd, Pamela (1999). Bloomsbury at Home. Pavilion. ISBN 9780810941113. OL 39418M.

==== Chapters and contributions ====
- Alexander, Christine (2005). Play and apprenticeship: the culture of family magazines. pp. 31–50., in Alexander & McMaster (2005)
- Birrento, Ana Clara. Virginia Woolf: Moments of Being (PDF). pp. 61–72. Archived (PDF) from the original on 19 February 2018., in Zamith & Flora (2007)
- Brassard, Geneviève (2016). Woolf in translation. John Wiley & Sons. pp. 441–452. ISBN 9781118457900. Archived from the original on 11 June 2020., in Berman (2016)
- Hussey, Mark (2006). Preface. pp. ix–xviii. ISBN 9780547543161. Archived from the original on 9 September 2021., in Woolf (1928)
- Hussey, Mark (2007). Biographical approaches. pp. 83–97., in Snaith (2007)
- Hussey, Mark (2012). Woolf: After Lives. Cambridge University Press. pp. 13–27. ISBN 9781107003613. Archived from the original on 11 June 2020., in Randall & Goldman (2012)
- Lee, Hermione (1995). Virginia Woolf and Offence. Oxford University Press. pp. 129–150. ISBN 9780191673917. Archived from the original on 28 March 2018., in Batchelor (1995)
- Minow-Pinkney, Makiko (2007). Psychonalytic approaches. Springer. pp. 60–82. ISBN 9780230206045. Archived from the original on 11 June 2020., in Snaith (2007)
- Minow-Pinkney, Makiko (2006). Domestic Arts: Virginia Woolf and entertaining. pp. 227–244. ISBN 9780748635535., in Humm (2006)
- Stimpson, Catherine R (1999). Foreword. University of Chicago Press. pp. xi–xiv. ISBN 9780226757469. Archived from the original on 11 June 2020., in Silver (1999)

=== Articles ===
==== Journals ====
- Boeira, Manuela V.; Berni, Gabriela de Á.; Passos, Ives C.; Kauer-Sant'Anna, Márcia; Kapczinski, Flávio (14 June 2016). "Virginia Woolf, neuroprogression, and bipolar disorder". Revista Brasileira de Psiquiatria. 39 (1): 69–71. doi:10.1590/1516-4446-2016-1962. PMC 7112729. PMID 27304258.
- Caramagno, Thomas C. (1989). "Review of Virginia Woolf and the Real World; The Invisible Presence: Virginia Woolf and the Mother-Daughter Relationship". Modern Philology (Review). 86 (3): 324–328. doi:10.1086/391719. JSTOR 438044.
- Church, Johanna (January 2016). "Literary Representations of Shell Shock as a Result of World War I in the Works of Virginia Woolf and Ernest Hemingway". Peace & Change. 41 (1): 52–63. doi:10.1111/pech.12172.
- Dalsimer, Katherine (May 2004). "Virginia Woolf (1882–1941)". American Journal of Psychiatry. 161 (5): 809. doi:10.1176/appi.ajp.161.5.809. PMID 15121644.
- Floyd, Riley H. (Summer 2016). ""Must Tell the Whole World": Septimus Smith as Virginia Woolf's Legal Messenge". Indiana Law Journal. 91 (4 (9)): 14721492. Archived from the original on 14 June 2018.
- Hite, Molly (11 March 2004). "Am I a Snob? Modernism and the Novel". Modernism/Modernity (Review). 11 (1): 190–192. doi:10.1353/mod.2004.0011. ISSN 1080-6601. S2CID 143644837.
- Koutsantoni, Katerina (June 2012). "Manic depression in literature: the case of Virginia Woolf". Medical Humanities. 38 (1): 7–14. doi:10.1136/medhum-2011-010075. PMID 22389442. S2CID 32059883.
- Lackey, Michael (2012). "Virginia Woolf and British Russophilia". Journal of Modern Literature. 36 (1): 150. doi:10.2979/jmodelite.36.1.150. S2CID 161783820. Archived from the original on 5 May 2020.
- Lewis, Alison M (Autumn 2000). "Caroline Emelia Stephen (1834-1909) and Virginia Woolf (1882-1941): A Quaker Influence on Modern English Literature". Quaker Theology (3). Archived from the original on 12 November 2015.
- Leonard, Diane R. (1981). "Proust and Virginia Woolf, Ruskin and Roger Fry: Modernist Visual Dynamics". Comparative Literature Studies. 18 (3): 333–343. JSTOR 40246272.
- McManus, Patricia (2008). "The "Offensiveness" of Virginia Woolf: From a Moral to a Political Reading". Woolf Studies Annual. 14: 92–138. Archived from the original on 28 March 2018 – via Questia.
- McTaggart, Ursula (2010). ""Opening the Door": The Hogarth Press as Virginia Woolf's Outsiders' Society". Tulsa Studies in Women's Literature. 29 (1): 63–81. doi:10.1353/tsw.2010.a435428. JSTOR 41337032. S2CID 142575214.
- Majumdar, Raja (Fall 1969). "Virginia Woolf and Thoreau". The Thoreau Society Bulletin (109): 4–5.
- Rodríguez, Laura María Lojo (2001–2002). "Contradiction and ambivalence: Virginia Woolf and the aesthetic experience in "The Duchess and the Jeweller"". Journal of English Studies. 3: 115–129. doi:10.18172/jes.73. hdl:10347/12297. Archived from the original on 30 March 2018.
- Schröder, Leena Kore (Autumn 2003). "Tales of Abjection and Miscegenation: Virginia Woolf's and Leonard Woolf's "Jewish" Stories". Twentieth Century Literature. 49 (3): 298–327. doi:10.2307/3175983. JSTOR 3175983.
- Swenson, Kristine (26 October 2017). "Hothouse Victorians: Art and Agency in Freshwater". Open Cultural Studies. 1 (1): 183–193. doi:10.1515/culture-2017-0017.
- Usui, Masami (2007). "Julia Margaret Cameron as a Feminist Precursor of Virginia Woolf" (PDF). Doshisha Studies in English. 80 (3): 59–83. Archived from the original (PDF) on 13 April 2016.

==== Dictionaries and encyclopaedias ====
- Bell, Alan (24 May 2012). "Stephen, Sir Leslie (1832–1904)". Oxford Dictionary of National Biography (online ed.). Oxford University Press. doi:10.1093/ref:odnb/36271. (Subscription, Wikipedia Library access or UK public library membership required.)
- Garnett, Jane (23 September 2004). "Stephen [née Jackson], Julia Prinsep (1846–1895)". Oxford Dictionary of National Biography (online ed.). Oxford University Press. doi:10.1093/ref:odnb/46943. (Subscription, Wikipedia Library access or UK public library membership required.)
- Gordon, Lyndall (2004). "Woolf [née Stephen], (Adeline) Virginia". Oxford Dictionary of National Biography (online ed.). Oxford University Press. doi:10.1093/ref:odnb/37018. (Subscription, Wikipedia Library access or UK public library membership required.)
- Reid, Panthea (2024). "Virginia Woolf". Encyclopaedia Britannica. Archived from the original on 20 May 2024.

==== Newspapers and magazines ====
- Bas, Marcel (23 January 2008). "Virginia Woolf's Class Consciousness: Snubbing or uplifting the masses?". Die Roepstem. Archived from the original on 7 August 2019.
- Bollen, Christopher (1 May 2012). "Toni Morrison". Interview. Archived from the original on 24 February 2018.
- Brockes, Emma (7 February 2011). "Michael Cunningham: A life in writing". The Guardian. Archived from the original on 24 October 2017.
- Edel, Leon (25 March 1979). "Triumphs and Symptoms". The New York Times (Review). Archived from the original on 14 April 2018.
- Gross, John (1 December 2006). "Mr. Virginia Woolf". Commentary. Archived from the original on 26 January 2018. archived version
- Haynes, Suyin (17 December 2019a). "'It Had a Lifelong Effect on Her.' A New Virginia Woolf Biography Deals With the Author's Experience of Childhood Sexual Abuse". Time. Archived from the original on 4 January 2020.
- Haynes, Suyin (23 August 2019b). "What to Know About Virginia Woolf's Love Affair With Vita Sackville-West". Time.
- Kronenberger, Louis (10 November 1929). "Virginia Woolf Discusses Women and fiction". The New York Times (Review). Archived from the original on 22 March 2018.
- Stone, Peter H. (Winter 1981). "Gabriel García Márquez, The Art of Fiction No. 69". The Paris Review. No. 82. Archived from the original on 25 February 2018.
- Trilling, Diana (21 March 1948). "Virginia Woolf's Special Realm". The New York Times (Review). Archived from the original on 30 March 2018.
- Wade, Francesca (26 June 2015). "Dangerous liaisons among the Bloomsbury set". The Daily Telegraph (Review). Archived from the original on 26 April 2018.
- Zakaria, Rafia (24 April 2017). "A Publisher of One's Own: Virginia and Leonard Woolf and the Hogarth Press". The Guardian.

=== Websites and documents ===
- Barmann, Jay (2 September 2014). "Castro's Rainbow Honor Walk Dedicated Today". SFiST. Archived from the original on 10 August 2019.
- Flood, Alison (13 November 2020). "Virginia Woolf statue fundraiser flooded with donations after Wollstonecraft controversy". The Guardian.
- Guest, Katy (16 November 2022). "A Statue of One's Own: the new Virginia Woolf sculpture that's challenging stereotypes". The Guardian.
- Jones, Josh (26 August 2013). "Virginia Woolf's Handwritten Suicide Note: A Painful and Poignant Farewell (1941)". Open Culture. Archived from the original on 24 February 2018.
- Temple, Emily (16 November 2022). "You can finally take a selfie with a full-size statue of Virginia Woolf". Literary Hub.
- Wilson, J.J.; Barrett, Eileen, eds. (Summer 2003). "Lucio Ruotolo 1927–2003" (PDF). Virginia Woolf Miscellany. Southern Connecticut State University. Archived (PDF) from the original on 9 March 2021. (includes invitation to first performance in 1935 and Lucio Ruotolo's introduction to the 1976 Hogarth Press edition)
- "Woolf". Collins English Dictionary. Harper Collins Publishers.
- "Virginia Woolf honoured by new Strand Campus building". News. King's College London. 2 May 2013. Archived from the original on 13 July 2015.
- "Virginia Woolf Society of Great Britain". Archived from the original on 18 December 2017.
- "日本ヴァージニア・ウルフ協会 / The Virginia Woolf Society of Japan". The Virginia Woolf Society of Japan.
- "Virginia Woolf Around The World". Exhibitions. E. J. Pratt Library, Victoria University, Toronto. 2018. January 2017.
- "Virginia Woolf – First Editions". Adrian Harrington Rare Books.

==== British Library ====
- Bradshaw, David (25 May 2016). "Mrs Dalloway and the First World War". Discovering Literature: 20th century. British Library. Archived from the original on 2 May 2017.
- Heyes, Duncan (25 May 2016). "The Hogarth Press". Discovering Literature: 20th century. British Library. Archived from the original on 27 March 2017.
- Taunton, Matthew (25 May 2016). "Modernism, time and consciousness: the influence of Henri Bergson and Marcel Proust". Discovering Literature: 20th century. British Library. Archived from the original on 3 May 2017.
- British Library (2018a). "A Room of One's Own by Virginia Woolf". 20th century collection. Archived from the original on 29 July 2018.
- British Library (2018d). "Kew Gardens by Virginia Woolf, 1927". 20th century collection. Archived from the original on 26 August 2020.
- British Library (2018c). "Two Stories, written and printed by Virginia and Leonard Woolf". 20th century collection. Archived from the original on 27 March 2017.

==== Virginia Woolf's homes and venues ====
- Wilkinson, Sheila M (2001). "Firle Village, Sussex". Archived from the original on 7 April 2018.
- "The Woolfs at Asham House". The Asham Award. The Asham Trust. Archived from the original on 6 March 2018.

=== Images ===
- Fry, Roger (1913). "Landscape at Asheham House, near Lewes, Sussex" (Painting). Art UK. Arts Council England.
- Ray, Man (12 April 1937). "Virginia Woolf". Time.

=== Audiovisual media ===
- Coe, Amanda (Producer) (2015). Life in Squares (T.V. series (3)). UK: BBC. see also Life in Squares
- Lee, Hermione (13 June 1997b). Virginia Woolf (TV). C-SPAN.
- Young, Eric Neal (Director) (2002). The Mind and Times of Virginia Woolf (Documentary). USA: Miramax. excerpt Archived 28 December 2017 at the Wayback Machine
- Woolf, Virginia (29 April 1937). Craftmanship (Radio). BBC Radio Words Fail Me.

=== By Woolf ===
==== Novels ====
- — (2012) [1925]. Mrs. Dalloway. Broadview Press. ISBN 978-1-55111-723-2. Archived from the original on 11 June 2020. see also Mrs Dalloway & Complete text
- — (2006) [1928]. DiBattista, Maria (ed.). Orlando (Annotated): A Biography. HMH. ISBN 978-0-547-54316-1. see also Orlando: A Biography & Complete text

==== Short stories ====
- Woolf, Virginia (2016a) [1944]. The Short Stories of Virginia Woolf. Read Books Limited. ISBN 978-1-4733-6304-5. Archived from the original on 11 June 2020. see also A Haunted House and Other Short Stories & Complete text

==== Essays ====
- — (2016) [1929]. A Room of One's Own. Read Books Limited. ISBN 978-1-4733-6305-2. Archived from the original on 12 June 2020. see also A Room of One's Own & Complete text

===== Essay collections =====
- — (1994). McNeillie, Andrew; Clarke, Stuart N. (eds.). The Essays of Virginia Woolf Volume Four 1925–1928. Harcourt Brace Jovanovich. ISBN 978-0-7012-0666-6. Archived from the original on 12 June 2020.
- — (1932). Leslie Stephen. pp. 67–73. & also here Archived 11 June 2020 at the Wayback Machine
- —(1934). "Walter Sickert: A Conversation" Archived 6 March 2022 at the Wayback Machine

==== Contributions ====
- Cameron, Julia Margaret (1973) [1926 Hogarth Press, edited by Leonard and Virginia Woolf]. Powell, Tristram (ed.). Victorian photographs of famous men & fair women. Introductions by Virginia Woolf and Roger Fry (Revised ed.). D. R. Godine. ISBN 978-0-87923-076-0. Archived from the original on 11 June 2020. (Digital edition)

==== Autobiographical writing ====
- Woolf, Virginia (1985) [1976]. Schulkind, Jeanne (ed.). Moments of Being (2nd ed.). San Diego: Harcourt Brace Jovanovich. ISBN 0156619180. OL 3028051M.
  - Schulkind, Jeanne. Introduction. pp. 11–24., in Woolf (1985)
  - Reminiscences. 1908. pp. 25–60.
  - A Sketch of the Past. 1940. pp. 61–160.
  - 22 Hyde Park Gate. 1921. pp. 162–177.

==== Diaries and notebooks ====
- Woolf, Virginia (1990). Leaska, Mitchell A (ed.). A passionate apprentice: the early journals, 1897–1909. Hogarth Press. ISBN 9780701208455. Archived from the original on 16 December 2019.
- — (1978). The Diary of Virginia Woolf Volume Three 1925–1930. Harcourt Brace Jovanovich. ISBN 9780151255993. Archived from the original on 11 June 2020.

==== Letters ====
- Piepenbring, Dan (25 January 2017). "Shut up in the Dark (Letter 531: Vanessa Bell, July 28, 1910)". The Paris Review. Archived from the original on 11 April 2018.
- — (1975). The Letters of Virginia Woolf Volume Three 1923–1928. Harcourt Brace Jovanovich. ISBN 978-0-15-150926-3. Archived from the original on 11 June 2020.
- — (1979). The Letters of Virginia Woolf Volume Four 1929–1931. Harcourt Brace Jovanovich. ISBN 978-0-15-150927-0. Archived from the original on 12 June 2020.
- — (1982). The Letters of Virginia Woolf Volume Five 1932–1935. Harcourt Brace Jovanovich. ISBN 978-0-15-650886-5. Archived from the original on 11 June 2020.
