= Virginia Woolf bibliography =

This is a bibliography of works by the English novelist and essayist Virginia Woolf (1882–1941).

== Novels ==
- The Voyage Out (1915)
- Night and Day (1919)
- Jacob's Room (1922)
- Mrs Dalloway (1925)
- To the Lighthouse (1927)
- Orlando: A Biography (1928)
- The Waves (1931)
- The Years (1937)
- Between the Acts (1941)

== Short fiction ==
=== Short stories ===
- A Woman's College from Outside
- Ancestors
- Blue & Green
- A Dialogue upon Mount Pentelicus
- The Duchess and the Jeweller
- The Evening Party
- The Fascination of the Pool
- Gypsy, the Mongrel
- Happiness
- A Haunted House
- In the Orchard
- The Introduction
- The Journal of Mistress Joan Martyn
- Kew Gardens
- The Lady in the Looking-Glass: A Reflection
- Lappin and Lappinova
- The Legacy
- Memoirs of a Novelist
- Miss Pryme
- Moments of Being: ‘Slater's Pins Have No Points’
- Monday or Tuesday
- Mrs Dalloway in Bond Street
- Nurse Lugton's Curtain
- Ode Written Partly in Prose of Seeing the Name of Cutbush Above a Butcher’s Shop in Pentonville
- Phyllis and Rosamond
- Portraits
- Scenes from the Life of a British Naval Officer
- A Society
- Solid Objects
- A Summing Up
- Sympathy
- The Mark on the Wall
- The Mysterious Case of Miss V.
- The New Dress
- The Searchlight
- The Shooting Party
- A Simple Melody
- The String Quartet
- The Symbol
- Three Pictures
- Together and Apart
- An Unwritten Novel
- The Watering Place
- The Widow and the Parrot: A True Story
- A Woman's College from Outside
- Uncle Vanya

=== Short fiction collections ===
- Two Stories (1917)
- Monday or Tuesday (1921)
- A Haunted House and Other Short Stories (1944)
- Mrs. Dalloway's Party (1973)
- The Complete Shorter Fiction (1985)
- The Life of Violet (2025)

== Cross-genre ==
- Flush: A Biography (1933)—Fictional "stream of consciousness" tale by Flush, a dog, but non-fiction in the sense of telling the story of the owner of the dog, Elizabeth Barrett Browning

== Non-fiction ==
=== Biography ===
- Roger Fry: A Biography (1940)

=== Book length essays ===
- A Room of One's Own (1929)
- On Being Ill (1930)
- Three Guineas (1938)

=== Essays ===
- A Room of One's Own
- Abbeys and Cathedrals
- Addison
- All About Books
- American Fiction
- An Essay in Criticism
- A Friend of Johnson
- A Letter to a Young Poet
- A Talk About Memoirs
- A Terribly Sensitive Mind
- Aurora Leigh
- The Art Of Fiction
- The Art of Biography
- The Artist and Politics
- The Captain's Death Bed
- The Cinema
- The Common Reader
- Congreve’s Comedies
- Crabbe
- Craftsmanship
- David Copperfield
- Defoe
- De Quincey's Autobiography
- The Cosmos
- The Countess of Pembroke's Arcadia
- The Docks of London
- Donne After Three Centuries
- Dorothy Osborne's Letters
- Dr. Burney's Evening Party
- The Duchess of Newcastle
- Edmund Gosse
- Ellen Terry
- Eliza and Sterne
- Evening Over Sussex: Reflections in a Motor Car
- The Elizabethan Lumber Room
- The Enchanted Organ: Anne Thackeray
- Fanny Burney’s Half-Sister
- The Faery Queen
- Fishing
- Flying Over London
- Four Figures I. Cowper and Lady Austen, Beau Brummell, Mary Wollstonecraft, Dorothy Wordsworth
- Four Figures II. Beau Brummell
- Four Figures III. Mary Wollstonecraft
- Four Figures IV. Dorothy Wordsworth
- The Dream
- The Duchess of Newcastle
- Gas
- George Eliot
- George Gissing
- George Moore
- Geraldine and Jane
- Genius: R. B. Haydon
- Gothic Romance
- Green Men’s Houses
- Half of Thomas Hardy
- Harriette Wilson
- Henry James
- Henry James I. Within the Rim
- Henry James II. The Old Order
- Henry James III. The Letters of Henry James
- Henry James’s Ghost Stories
- The Historian and The Gibbon
- Horace Walpole
- Hours in a Library
- How It Strikes a Contemporary
- How Should One Read a Book?
- I Am Christina Rossetti
- Impassioned Prose
- Jack Mytton
- Jane Austen
- Jayne Eyre and Wuthering Heights
- Jones and Wilkinson
- Joseph Conrad
- The Leaning Tower
- Leslie Stephen
- Lewis Carroll
- Life and the Novelist
- Life Itself
- Lives of the Obscure - Laetitia Pilkington
- Lives of the Obscure - Taylors and Edgeworths
- Lockhart's Criticism
- Lord Chesterfield's Letters to His Son
- Madame de Sévigné
- The Man at the Gate
- Memories of a Working Women's Guild
- Middlebrow
- Modern Fiction (Essay)
- Modern Letters
- Money and Love
- Montaigne
- Mr. Bennett and Mrs. Brown (1924)
- Mr. Conrad: A Conversation
- Mrs. Thrale
- The Moment: Summer’s Night
- The Modern Essay
- The Narrow Bridge of Art
- The New Biography
- The Niece of an Earl
- Not One of Us
- Notes on an Elizabethan Play
- Notes on D. H. Lawrence
- The Novels of E. M. Forster
- The Novels of George Meredith
- The Novels of Thomas Hardy
- The Novels of Turgenev
- Old Mrs. Grey
- Oliver Goldsmith
- On Being Ill
- On Not Knowing Greek
- On Rereading Meredith
- On Rereading Novels
- The Oxford Street Tide
- Outlines I. Miss Mitford
- Outlines II. Bentley
- Outlines III. Lady Dorothy Nevill
- Outlines IV. Archbishop Thomson
- Personalities
- Phases of Fiction
- Pictures
- Portrait of a Londoner
- Professions for Women
- Rambling Round Evelyn
- Reading
- Reflections at Sheffield Place
- Reviewing
- Robinson Crusoe
- Roger Fry
- Royalty
- Ruskin
- Sara Coleridge
- Selina Trimmer
- Sir Walter Raleigh
- Sir Walter Scott. Gas at Abbotsford
- Sir Walter Scott. The Antiquary
- Sterne
- Sterne's Ghost
- Street Haunting: A London Adventure
- The Strange Elizabethans
- Swift's Journal of Stella
- The Death of the Moth
- The Dream
- The Duchess of Newcastle
- The Elizabethan Lumber Room
- The Enchanted Organ: Anne Thackeray
- The Faery Queen
- The Historian and The Gibbon
- The Humane Art
- The Leaning Tower
- The Man at the Gate
- The Modern Essay
- The Moment: Summer’s Night
- The Narrow Bridge of Art
- The New Biography
- The Niece of an Earl
- The Novels of E. M. Forster
- The Novels of George Meredith
- The Novels of Thomas Hardy
- The Novels of Turgenev
- The Oxford Street Tide
- The Pastons and Chaucer
- The Patron and the Crocus
- The Rev. William Cole: A Letter
- The Royal Academy
- The Russian Point of View
- The Sentimental Journey
- The Strange Elizabethans
- The Sun and the Fish
- Thoughts on Peace in an Air Raid
- Three Guineas
- Three Pictures
- Thunder at Wembley
- To Spain
- This is the House of Commons
- Twelfth Night at the Old Vic
- Two Antiquaries: Walpole and Cole
- Two Parsons I. James Woodforde, John Skinner
- Two Parsons II. John Skinner
- Two Women: Emily Davies and Lady Augusta Stanley
- Walter Raleigh
- Walter Sickert: A Conversation
- Waxworks at the Abbey
- White's Selborne
- Why?
- William Hazlitt
- Women and Fiction

=== Essay collections ===
- Modern Fiction (1919)
- The Common Reader (1925)
- The London Scene (1931)
- The Common Reader: Second Series (1932)
- The Death of the Moth and Other Essays (1942)
- The Moment and Other Essays (1947)
- The Captain's Death Bed And Other Essays (1950)
- Granite and Rainbow (1958)
- Collected Essays (four volumes, 1967)
- Books and Portraits (1978)
- Women And Writing (1979)

== Drama ==
- Freshwater: A Comedy edited by Lucio P. Ruotolo with drawings by Edward Gorey (first version 1923, revised and performed 1935, published 1976)

== Translation ==
- Stavrogin's Confession & the Plan of the Life of a Great Sinner, from the notes of Fyodor Dostoevsky, translated in partnership with S. S. Koteliansky (1922)

== Autobiographical writings ==
- Moments of Being (1976) [2nd ed. 1985]
- The Platform of Time: Memoirs of Family and Friends, edited by S. P. Rosenbaum (London, Hesperus, 2007)

== Diaries and journals ==
- A Writer’s Diary (1953) - Extracts from the complete diary
- A Moment's Liberty: the shorter diary (1990)
- The Diary of Virginia Woolf (five volumes) - Diary of Virginia Woolf from 1915 to 1941
- Passionate Apprentice: The Early Journals, 1897-1909 (1990)
- Travels With Virginia Woolf (1993) - Greek travel diary of Virginia Woolf, edited by Jan Morris

== Letters ==
- Congenial Spirits: the selected letters (1993)
- The Flight of the Mind: Letters of Virginia Woolf vol 1 1888 - 1912 (1975)
- The Question of Things Happening: Letters of Virginia Woolf vol 2 1913 - 1922 (1976)
- A Change of Perspective: Letters of Virginia Woolf vol 3 1923 - 1928 (1977)
- A Reflection of the Other Person: Letters of Virginia Woolf vol 4 1929 - 1931 (1978)
- The Sickle Side of the Moon: Letters of Virginia Woolf vol 5 1932 - 1935 (1979)
- Leave the Letters Till We're Dead: Letters of Virginia Woolf vol 6 1936 - 1941 (1980)
- Paper Darts: The Illustrated Letters of Virginia Woolf (1991)
- Life as We Have Known It introductory letter (1931)

== Prefaces and contributions ==
- Introduction to Selections Autobiographical and Imaginative from the Works of George Gissing ed. Alfred C. Gissing (London & New York, 1929)

== Selected publications ==
See Kirkpatrick & Clarke (1997), VWS (2018), Carter (2002)

=== Novels ===
- Woolf, Virginia (2017) [1915]. The Voyage Out. FV Éditions. ISBN 979-10-299-0459-2. Archived from the original on 12 June 2020. see also The Voyage Out & Complete text
- — (2004) [1919a]. Night and Day. 1st World Publishing. ISBN 978-1-59540-530-2. Archived from the original on 12 June 2020. see also Night and Day & Complete text
- — (2015) [1922a]. Jacob's Room. Mondial. ISBN 978-1-59569-114-9. Archived from the original on 11 June 2020. see also Jacob's Room & Complete text
- — (2012) [1925]. Mrs. Dalloway. Broadview Press. ISBN 978-1-55111-723-2. Archived from the original on 11 June 2020. see also Mrs Dalloway & Complete text
- — (2004) [1927]. To the Lighthouse. Collector's Library. ISBN 978-1-904633-49-5. Archived from the original on 12 June 2020. see also To the Lighthouse & Complete text, also Texts at Woolf Online Archived 18 August 2021 at the Wayback Machine
- — (2006) [1928]. DiBattista, Maria (ed.). Orlando (Annotated): A Biography. HMH. ISBN 978-0-547-54316-1. see also Orlando: A Biography & Complete text
- — (2000) [1931]. The Waves. Wordsworth Editions. ISBN 978-1-84022-410-8. Archived from the original on 11 June 2020. see also The Waves & Complete text
- — (1936). The Years. Hogarth Press. see also The Years
- — (2014) [1941]. Between the Acts. Houghton Mifflin Harcourt. ISBN 978-0-544-45178-0. Archived from the original on 11 June 2020. see also Between the Acts & Complete text

=== Short stories ===
- Woolf, Virginia (2016a) [1944]. The Short Stories of Virginia Woolf. Read Books Limited. ISBN 978-1-4733-6304-5. Archived from the original on 11 June 2020. see also A Haunted House and Other Short Stories & Complete text
- — (2015) [1917 Hogarth Press]. The Mark on the Wall. Booklassic. ISBN 978-963-522-263-6. see also The Mark on the Wall & Complete text
- — (7 July 2015) [1919b Hogarth Press]. Kew Gardens. Booklassic. ISBN 978-963-522-264-3. see also Kew Gardens & Complete text

=== Cross-genre ===
- Woolf, Virginia (1998) [1933]. Flush. Oxford University Press. ISBN 978-0-19-283328-0. Archived from the original on 11 June 2020. see also Flush: A Biography & Complete text

=== Drama ===
- Woolf, Virginia (2017) [1935]. Freshwater: A Comedy by Virginia Woolf (The 1923 & 1935 Editions). Musaicum Books. ISBN 978-80-272-3556-8. Archived from the original on 11 June 2020. see also Freshwater
- — (1976). Ruotolo, Lucio (ed.). Freshwater: a comedy. Illustrations: Edward Gorey. Harcourt Brace Jovanovich. ISBN 9780151334872. Archived from the original on 11 June 2020.

=== Biography ===
- Woolf, Virginia (2017) [1940]. Roger Fry: A Biography. Musaicum Books. ISBN 978-80-272-3516-2. Archived from the original on 12 June 2020. see also Roger Fry: A Biography & Complete text

=== Essays ===
- Woolf, Virginia (14 December 1904). "Haworth, November 1904". The Guardian. Archived from the original on 7 February 2016.
- — (2016) [1929]. A Room of One's Own. Read Books Limited. ISBN 978-1-4733-6305-2. Archived from the original on 12 June 2020. see also A Room of One's Own & Complete text
- — (2017) [1924 Hogarth Press]. Mr. Bennett and Mrs. Brown. Virginia Woolf. ISBN 978-88-260-3291-7. see also Mr. Bennett and Mrs. Brown & Complete text
- — (2016) [1932 Hogarth Press]. A Letter to a Young Poet. Read Books Limited. ISBN 978-1-4733-6307-6. Archived from the original on 12 June 2020. see also A Letter to a Young Poet & Complete text
- — (2016) [1938]. Three Guineas. Read Books Limited. ISBN 978-1-4733-6301-4. Archived from the original on 11 June 2020. see also Three Guineas & Complete text

==== Essay collections ====
- Woolf, Virginia (1986–2011). McNeillie, Andrew; Clarke, Stuart N. (eds.). The Essays of Virginia Woolf 6 vols. Random House.
  - — (1986). The Essays of Virginia Woolf Volume Two 1912–1918. Harcourt Brace Jovanovich. ISBN 978-0-15-629055-5. Archived from the original on 11 June 2020.
    - Ackroyd 1988 (Review)
  - — (1994). The Essays of Virginia Woolf Volume Four 1925–1928. Harcourt Brace Jovanovich. ISBN 978-0-7012-0666-6. Archived from the original on 12 June 2020.
  - — (2017). The Essays of Virginia Woolf Volume Five 1929–1932. Random House. ISBN 978-1-4481-8194-0. Archived from the original on 11 June 2020.
  - — (2011). The Essays of Virginia Woolf Volume Six 1933–1941. Random House. ISBN 978-0-7012-0671-0. Archived from the original on 11 June 2020.
    - Patten 2011 (Review)
- — (2016b). The Collected Essays and Letters of Virginia Woolf – Including a Short Biography of the Author. Read Books Limited. ISBN 978-1-4733-6310-6. Archived from the original on 11 June 2020.
- — (2017) [1947 Hogarth Press]. Woolf, Leonard (ed.). The Moment & Other Essays (posthumous). Musaicum Books. ISBN 978-80-272-3619-0. Archived from the original on 11 June 2020. Complete text Archived 3 March 2018 at the Wayback Machine
  - The Leaning Tower. 1940. pp. 100ff. Archived from the original on 3 March 2018.
    - Trilling 1948 (Review)
- — (1950). Woolf, Leonard (ed.). The Captain's death bed: and other essays (posthumous). Hogarth Press. ISBN 9780701204563. First American edition published by Harcourt, Brace and Company, New York, 1950.
  - — (1932). Leslie Stephen. pp. 67–73. & also here Archived 11 June 2020 at the Wayback Machine
  - — (1934). "Walter Sickert: A Conversation" Archived 6 March 2022 at the Wayback Machine
- — (2009). Bradshaw, David (ed.). Selected Essays. Oxford University Press. ISBN 978-0-19-955606-9. Archived from the original on 11 June 2020.
- — (2017). The Greatest Essays of Virginia Woolf. Musaicum Books. ISBN 978-80-272-3514-8. Archived from the original on 11 June 2020.

=== Contributions ===
- Cameron, Julia Margaret (1973) [1926 Hogarth Press, edited by Leonard and Virginia Woolf]. Powell, Tristram (ed.). Victorian photographs of famous men & fair women. Introductions by Virginia Woolf and Roger Fry (Revised ed.). D. R. Godine. ISBN 978-0-87923-076-0. Archived from the original on 11 June 2020. (Digital edition)

=== Autobiographical writing ===
- Woolf, Virginia (2003) [1953]. Woolf, Leonard (ed.). A Writer's Diary. HMH. ISBN 978-0-547-54691-9. Archived from the original on 11 June 2020.
  - Auden 1954 (Review)
- — (1985) [1976]. Schulkind, Jeanne (ed.). Moments of being: unpublished autobiographical writings (2nd ed.). Harcourt Brace Jovanovich. ISBN 978-0-15-162034-0. Archived from the original on 11 June 2020. (see Moments of Being)
  - Schulkind, Jeanne (2007). Preface to the Second Edition. p. 6. Bibcode:2007ess..bookD..17M., in Woolf (1985) (excerpts)
  - Schulkind, Jeanne. Introduction. pp. 11–24., in Woolf (1985)
  - Reminiscences. 1908. pp. 25–60.
  - A Sketch of the Past. 1940. pp. 61–160. (Note: Originally published in 1976, the discovery in 1980 of a 77-page typescript acquired by the British Library, containing 27 pages of new material necessitated a new edition in 1985. In particular, 18 pages of new material was inserted between pp. 107–125 of the first edition. Page 107 of that edition resumes as page 125 in the second edition, so that page references to the first edition in the literature, after p. 107 are found 18–19 pages later in the second edition. All page references to Sketches are to the second edition, otherwise to the first edition of Moments of Being. This added 22 new pages, and changed the pagination for the Memoir Club essays that followed by an extra 22 pages. Pagination also varies between printings of the 2nd. edition. Pages here refer to the 1985 Harvest (North American) edition) (excerpts – 1st ed.)
    Memoir Club Contributions
    - 22 Hyde Park Gate. 1921. pp. 162–178.
    - Old Bloomsbury. 1922. pp. 179–202.
    - Am I a Snob?. 1936. pp. 203–220.

=== Diaries and notebooks ===
- Woolf, Virginia (1990). Leaska, Mitchell A (ed.). A passionate apprentice: the early journals, 1897–1909. Hogarth Press. ISBN 9780701208455. Archived from the original on 16 December 2019.
- Woolf, Virginia (2003). Bradshaw, David (ed.). Carlyle's House and Other Sketches. Hesperus Press. ISBN 978-1-84391-055-8.
- Woolf, Virginia (1977–1984). Bell, Anne Oliver (ed.). The Diary of Virginia Woolf 5 vols. Houghton Mifflin.
  - — (1979). The Diary of Virginia Woolf Volume One 1915–1919. HarperCollins Publishers. ISBN 978-0-544-31037-7. Archived from the original on 11 June 2020.
  - — (1981). The Diary of Virginia Woolf Volume Two 1920–1924. Harcourt Brace Jovanovich. ISBN 978-0-14-005283-1. Archived from the original on 4 February 2021.
  - — (1978). The Diary of Virginia Woolf Volume Three 1925–1930. Harcourt Brace Jovanovich. ISBN 9780151255993. Archived from the original on 11 June 2020.
  - — (1985). The Diary of Virginia Woolf Volume Five 1936–1941. Houghton Mifflin Harcourt. ISBN 978-0-15-626040-4. Archived from the original on 11 June 2020.
- — (2008). Rosenbaum, S. P. (ed.). The Platform of Time: Memoirs of Family and Friends. Hesperus Press. ISBN 978-1-84391-711-3. Archived from the original on 12 June 2020.

=== Letters ===
- — (1975–1980). Nicolson, Nigel; Banks, Joanne Trautmann (eds.). The Letters of Virginia Woolf 6 vols. New York: Harcourt Brace Jovanovich. ISBN 9780151509263.
  - — (1977). The Letters of Virginia Woolf Volume One 1888–1912. Harcourt Brace Jovanovich. ISBN 978-0-15-650881-0. Archived from the original on 11 June 2020.
    - "Shut up in the Dark (Letter 531: Vanessa Bell, July 28, 1910)". The Paris Review. 25 January 2017. Archived from the original on 11 April 2018.
  - — (1982). The Letters of Virginia Woolf Volume Two 1912–1922. Harvest/HBJ Books. ISBN 978-0-15-650882-7. Archived from the original on 11 June 2020.
  - — (1975). The Letters of Virginia Woolf Volume Three 1923–1928. Harcourt Brace Jovanovich. ISBN 978-0-15-150926-3. Archived from the original on 11 June 2020.
  - — (1979). The Letters of Virginia Woolf Volume Four 1929–1931. Harcourt Brace Jovanovich. ISBN 978-0-15-150927-0. Archived from the original on 12 June 2020.
    - Edel 1979 (Review)
  - — (1982). The Letters of Virginia Woolf Volume Five 1932–1935. Harcourt Brace Jovanovich. ISBN 978-0-15-650886-5. Archived from the original on 11 June 2020.

=== Photograph albums ===
- Woolf, Virginia (1983). "Virginia Woolf Monk's House photographs, ca. 1867–1967 (MS Thr 564)" (Guide). Harvard Theatre Collection, Houghton Library, Harvard Library. Archived from the original on 2 February 2018.
  - List of Album Guides Archived 11 June 2020 at the Wayback Machine
1. Album 1 MS Thr 557 (1863–1938) Archived 2 February 2018 at the Wayback Machine
2. Album 2 MS Thr 559 (1909–1922) Archived 2 February 2018 at the Wayback Machine
3. Album 3 MS Thr 560 (1890–1933) Archived 28 January 2018 at the Wayback Machine
4. Album 4 MS Thr 561 (1890–1947) Archived 31 January 2018 at the Wayback Machine
5. Album 5 MS Thr 562 (1892–1938) Archived 2 February 2018 at the Wayback Machine
6. Album 6 MS Thr 563 (1850–1900) Archived 2 February 2018 at the Wayback Machine

=== Collections ===
- Woolf, Virginia (2023) "The Mark on the Wall" in Virginia's Sisters: An Anthology of Women's Writings. Aurora Metro Books. ISBN 9781912430789
- Woolf, Virginia (2013). Delphi Complete Works of Virginia Woolf (Illustrated). Delphi Classics. ISBN 978-1-908909-19-0. Archived from the original on 11 June 2020.
- — (2015). "eBooks@Adelaide". Library of University of Adelaide. Archived from the original on 12 April 2018.
- — (2017a). The Complete Works of Virginia Woolf. Musaicum Books. ISBN 978-80-272-1784-7. Archived from the original on 11 June 2020.
- — (2007). "Virginia Woolf". Project Gutenberg Australia. Archived from the original on 26 March 2018.

== Sources ==
- Ackroyd, Peter (27 March 1988). "The knots and loops of literature". The New York Times (Review). Archived from the original on 29 March 2018.
- Auden, W. H. (27 February 1954). "Virginia Woolf: A Consciousness of Reality". The New Yorker (Review). Archived from the original on 31 March 2018.
- Carter, Jason (14 September 2010). "Virginia Woolf Seminar". Women's Studies, University of Alabama, Huntsville. Archived from the original on 1 March 2018.
  - "Chronological List of Works By Virginia Woolf". 4 December 2002., in Carter (2010)
- Edel, Leon (25 March 1979). "Triumphs and Symptoms". The New York Times (Review). Archived from the original on 14 April 2018.
- Kirkpatrick, Brownlee Jean; Clarke, Stuart N. (1997). A Bibliography of Virginia Woolf. Clarendon Press. ISBN 978-0-19-818383-9. Archived from the original on 12 June 2020.
- Patten, Eve (2 April 2011). "Virginia Woolf's battle with her tea table training". The Irish Times (Review). Archived from the original on 8 March 2021.
- Trilling, Diana (21 March 1948). "Virginia Woolf's Special Realm". The New York Times (Review). Archived from the original on 30 March 2018.
- "Virginia Woolf Society of Great Britain". Archived from the original on 18 December 2017.
  - "The Principal Works of Virginia Woolf (1882–1941)". Archived from the original on 25 August 2017., in VWS (2017)
