= A Haunted House and Other Short Stories =

Short story collection by Virginia Woolf

A Haunted House
- First edition cover
- Author: Virginia Woolf
- Cover artist: Vanessa Bell
- Language: English
- Publisher: Hogarth Press
- Publication date: January 1943
- Publication place: United Kingdom
- Media type: Print (hardcover)
- Pages: 124 pp

A Haunted House is a 1943 collection of 18 short stories by Virginia Woolf. It was produced by her husband Leonard Woolf after her death although in the foreword he states that they had discussed its production together.

- The first six stories appeared in her only previous collection Monday or Tuesday in 1921 :
  - "A Haunted House"
  - "Monday or Tuesday"
  - "An Unwritten Novel"
  - "The String Quartet"
  - "Kew Gardens"
  - "The Mark on the Wall"
- The next six appeared in magazines between 1922 and 1941 :
  - "The New Dress"
  - "The Shooting Party"
  - "Lappin and Lappinova"
  - "Solid Objects"
  - "The Lady in the Looking-Glass"
  - "The Duchess and the Jeweller"
- The final six were unpublished, although only "Moments of Being" and "The Searchlight" were finally revised by Virginia Woolf herself :
  - "Moments of Being"
  - "The Man who Loved his Kind"
  - "The Searchlight"
  - "The Legacy"
  - "Together and Apart"
  - "A Summing Up"
