= Letter collection =

Non-fiction compilation of letters

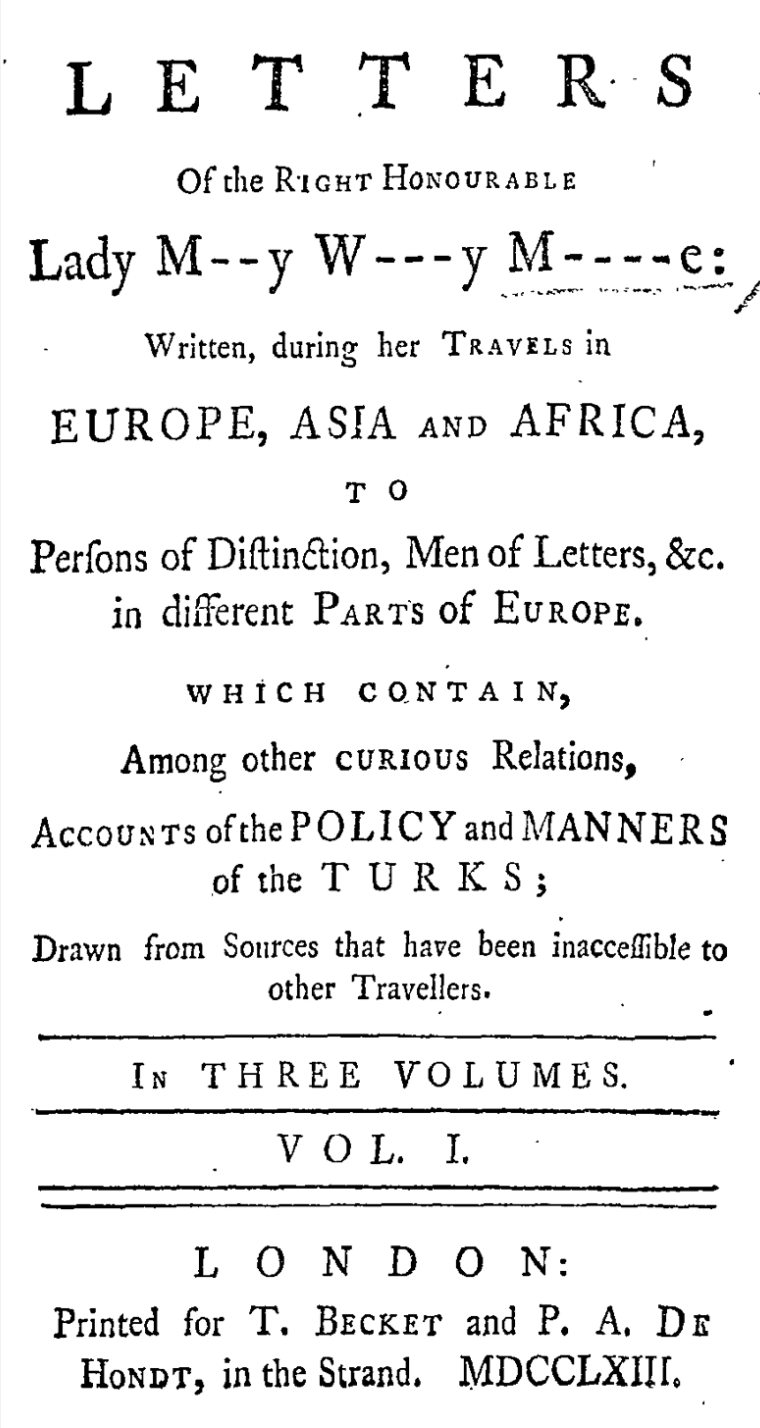
Title page of Mary Wortley Montagu's Turkish Embassy Letters (1763)

A letter collection consists of a publication, usually a book, containing a compilation of letters written by a real person. Unlike an epistolary novel, a letter collection belongs to non-fiction literature. As a publication, a letter collection is distinct from an archive, which is a repository of original documents.

Usually, the original letters are written over the course of the lifetime of an important individual, noted either for their social position or their intellectual influence, and consist of messages to specific recipients. They might also be open letters intended for a broad audience. After these letters have served their original purpose, a letter collection gathers them to be republished as a group. Letter collections, as a form of life writing, serve a biographical purpose. They also typically select and organize the letters to serve an aesthetic or didactic aim, as in literary belles-lettres and religious epistles. The editor who chooses, organizes, and sometimes alters the letters plays a major role in the interpretation of the published collection. Letter collections have existed as a form of literature in most times and places where letter-writing played a prominent part of public life. Before the invention of printing, letter collections were recopied and circulated as manuscripts, like all literature.

== Letter collections in history ==
=== Antiquity ===
In ancient Rome, Cicero (106–43 BC) is known for his letters to Atticus, to Brutus, to friends, and to his brother. Seneca the Younger (c. 5 – 65 CE) and Pliny the Younger (c. 61 – c. 112 CE) both published their own letters. Seneca's Letters to Lucilius are strongly moralizing. Pliny's Epistulae have a self-consciously literary style. Ancient letter collections typically did not organize the letters chronologically.

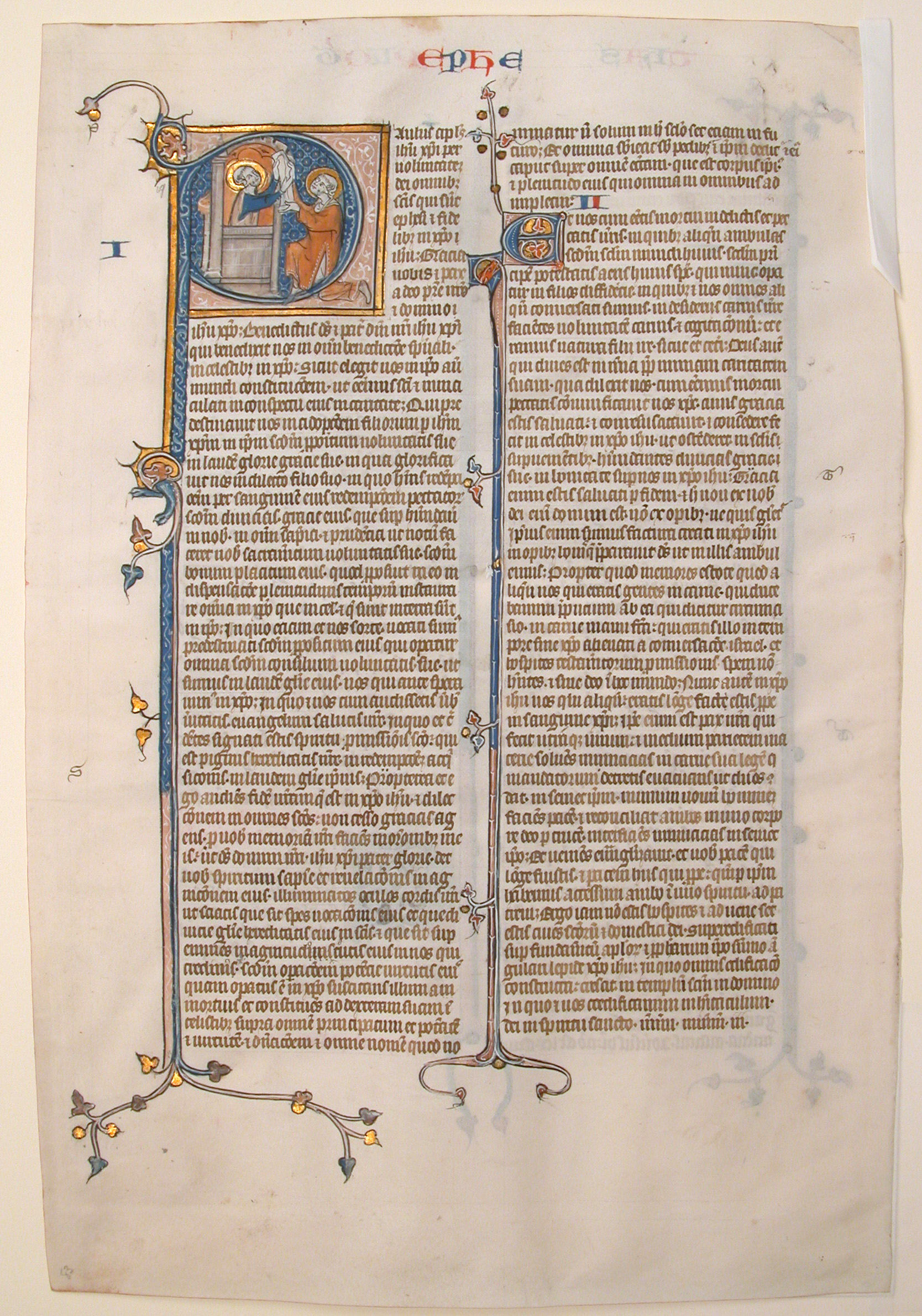
Page of a French medieval manuscript copy of the Epistle of Saint Paul to the Ephesians (c. 1300 AD)

Early Christianity is also associated with collected and published letters, typically referred to as epistles for their didactic focus. Paul the Apostle (c. 5 – c. 64/67 CE) is known for the Pauline epistles which make up thirteen books of the New Testament, while the so-called Catholic epistles make up seven other books.

In late antiquity (340–600 CE), letter collections became particularly popular and widespread. Saint Augustine (354–430 CE) and Saint Jerome (c. 342–347 – 420 CE) are noted in this period for their prolific and influential theological letters.

=== Medieval and Renaissance Europe ===
Medieval European letter-writers were heavily influenced by Cicero in the development of rhetorical conventions (ars dictaminis) for letter-writing.

Petrarch (1304–1374 CE) added a greater level of personal autobiographical detail in his Epistolae familiares. Erasmus (1466 –1536 CE) and Justus Lipsius (1547–1606 CE) also promoted flexibility and enjoyable reading in letter-writing, rather than a rule-focused formula.

=== Eighteenth-century Europe ===
Published letters and diaries were particularly prominent in eighteenth-century British print, sometimes called "the defining genres of the period." Particularly popular were letter collections focused on the private lives of their writers, which would garner praise based on how well they could demonstrate the personal character of the author. Stylistically, eighteenth-century familiar letters were influenced more by the amusing Vincent Voiture (1597–1648) than the formal classics of Cicero, Pliny, and Seneca. The letters of Marie de Rabutin-Chantal (1626–1696) and her daughter were published beginning in 1725, and widely regarded across Europe as the model for witty, enjoyable letters.

Many eighteenth-century figures gained their reputations as eloquent writers primarily through their letters, such as the bluestockings Elizabeth Montagu and Mary Delany.

=== Twentieth-century letters ===
Letter collections were less prominent as literary publications in the twentieth century. Instead of being published during the writer's lifetime in order to build their reputation, the letters of twentieth-century artists were typically collected and published posthumously in order to cement their legacy. Some nineteenth-century authors, such as Charles Dickens, Mark Twain, and Edith Wharton, first had their letters published in the twentieth century as scholarly editions. Major collections by twentieth-century authors include those of Joseph Conrad, George Bernard Shaw, James Joyce, and Virginia Woolf. Other artists' letters in the twentieth century include The Letters of Vincent van Gogh (first published in 1914), Letters to a Young Poet by Rainer Maria Rilke (first published in 1929), and Letters to Milena by Franz Kafka (first published in 1952).

== Relationship to authentic letters ==
Letter collections have not always been considered "literary" texts. In the nineteenth century, scholars like Adolf Deissmann promoted a distinction between a "real missive" and a "literary letter": a "real missive" was a private document focusing solely on a functional communication purpose, whereas a "literary letter" was written with the expectation of a wide audience and carried artistic value. In this distinction, real missives could be used as evidence of factual events, while literary letters required interpretation as works of art. Contemporary scholars, however, see all letters as having both historical information and artistic merit, both of which require careful contextualization.

In eighteenth century Europe, many works were written in an epistolary style without having been mailed as real letters: these included scholarly research and travel narratives, as well as epistolary novels. The term "familiar letters" was used to designate letter collections consisting of authentic correspondence which had been written for a private audience prior to publication.

== Role of the collector ==
It was more common for authors to collect their own letters in Latin antiquity than in Greek antiquity. In Latin antiquity, Julius Caesar (100 – 44 BCE) published a self-organized letter collection, which does not survive today. Cicero also mentioned plans to collect his own letters, though he did not do so before his death. Pliny the Younger's letters are the oldest extant letter collection in which the letters were collected by the author himself.

== See also ==
- Letter
- Autobiography
- Biography
- Epistle
- Epistolography
- Epistolary novel
- Epistolary poem
- Belles-lettres
- List of fictional diaries
