= New Dress =

(The) New Dress may refer to:

- "New Dress", a song by Depeche Mode from their 1986 album Black Celebration
- "New Dress", a 1986 single by Cheryl Lynn later released on her 1987 album Start Over
- The New Dress (film), a 1911 American short silent film by D. W. Griffith
- "The New Dress" (short story), a short story by Virginia Woolf
- The New Dress, a 1907 American short silent film by Lewin Fitzhamon
