= A Sketch of the Past =

1939 essay by Virginia Woolf

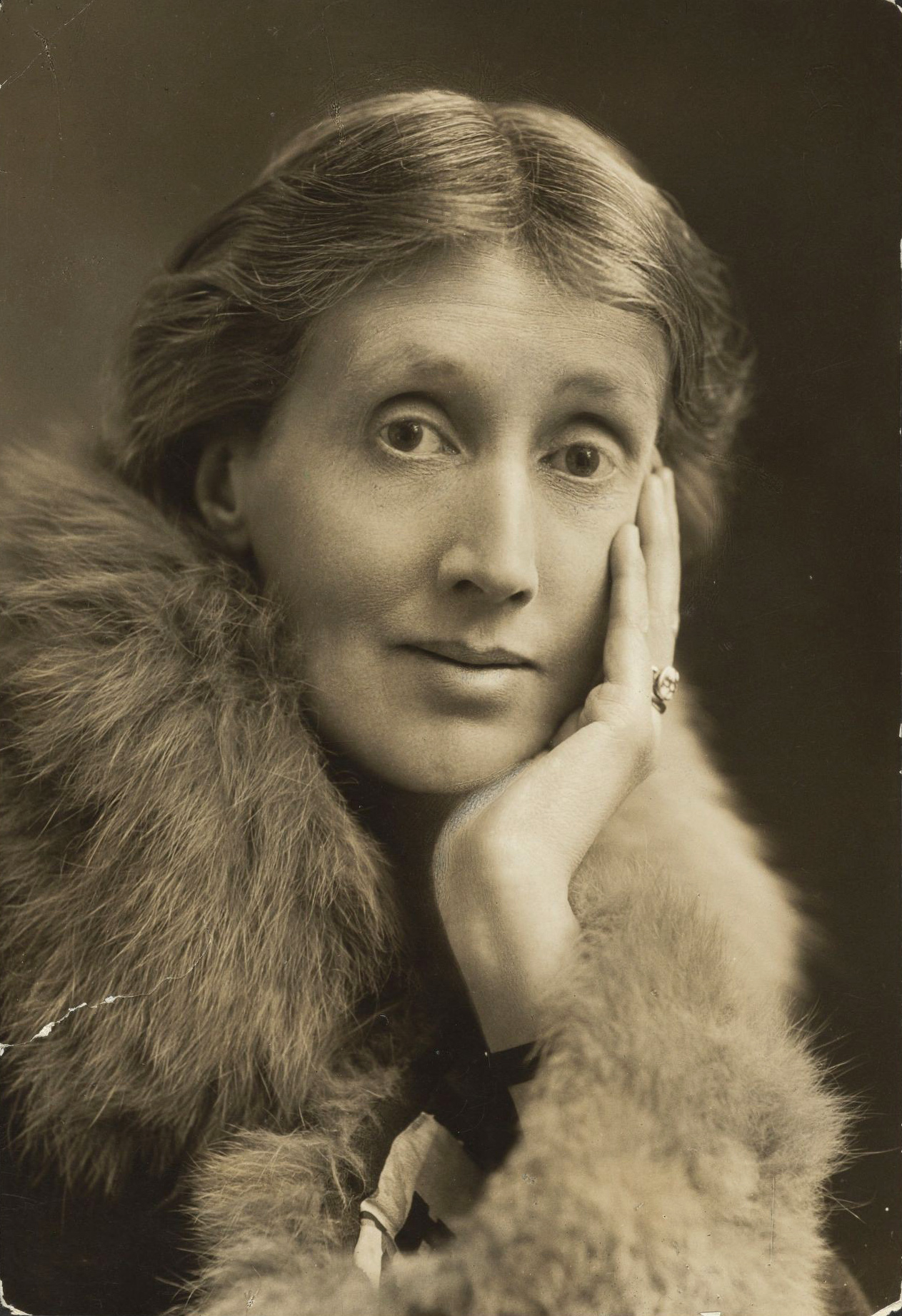
- Author Virginia Woolf
- Author: Virginia Woolf
- Genre: Autobiographical essay
- Publication date: 1939

"A Sketch of the Past" is an autobiographical essay written by Virginia Woolf in 1939. It was written as a break from writing her biography of Roger Fry, English artist and critic, and fellow member of the Bloomsbury Group. It was later edited and posthumously published by Leonard Woolf and now can be found in Moments of Being, a collection of her autobiographical writing.
