= Nasennia gens =

The gens Nasennia was an obscure plebeian family at Rome. None of the Nasennii held any of the higher offices of the Roman state, and the family is best known from Gaius Nasennius, a soldier in the time of Caesar. Many other Nasennii are known from inscriptions.

== Origin ==
The nomen Nasennius appears to belong to a class of names ending in -ennius and probably derived from Oscan. Chase compares it with the nomen Herennius, suggesting that each developed from an earlier form with the suffix -endius. An Oscan root points to the Nasennii originally being of Sabine or Samnite extraction.

== Praenomina ==
The only praenomina found among the Nasennii known from existing records are Gaius, Lucius, and Aulus, all of which were very common throughout Roman history. Their prevalence among the Nasennii may be due to the fact that many of those whose names are recorded were freedmen, who assumed the praenomina of their masters when they obtained Roman citizenship.

== Members ==
This list includes abbreviated praenomina. For an explanation of this practice, see filiation.

- Gaius Nasennius, a centurion who served in Crete under Quintus Caecilius Metellus Creticus, sought the assistance of Cicero after Caesar's death. The orator wrote Nasennius a letter of introduction to Marcus Junius Brutus.
- Lucius Nasennius Jucundus, a freedman buried at Rome in the time of the emperor Vespasian.
- Gaius Nasennius Musaeus, named in several inscriptions from Ostia Antica, dating to the time of Hadrian.
- Gaius Nasennius Felix, named in inscriptions from Ostia Antica, one of which dates to AD 143.
- Gaius Nasennius C. f. Felix, named in an inscription from Ostia Antica.
- Gaius Nasennius Fortunatus, named in an inscription from Ostia Antica.
- Gaius Nasennius Thalamus, named in an inscription from Ostia Antica.
- Nasennius Salutaris, named in a funerary inscription from Rome.
- Nasennius Pudens, one of the heirs of Publius Cornelius Victor, mentioned in the latter's funerary inscription at Rome.
- Gaius Nasennius Plebeius, erected a monument at Rome in memory of Gaius Julius Unio. He is also named in an inscription from Castrimoenium.
- Lucius Nasennius Secundus, named in the funerary inscription of his wife, Maximina Agrippina, at Caesarea in Mauretania Caesariensis.
- Nasennius Orestinianus, a friend of Gaius Taminius Verus, named in an inscription from Collescipoli, near Interamna Nahars.
- Gaius Nasennius C. f. Priscus, named in an inscription from Herculaneum.
- Aulus Nasennius, the former master of several freedmen and women from Capua.
- Aulus Nasennius A. l., a freedman, named in an inscription from Capua.
- Aulus Nasennius, a freedman of the wife of Aulus Nasennius, known from an inscription at Capua.
- Eros Nasennia A. l. Dardanalia, a freedwoman of Aulus Nasennius, known from an inscription at Capua.
- Aulus Nasennius Philargurus, a freedman of the wife of Aulus Nasennius, known from an inscription at Capua.
- Aulus Nasennius Optatus, a freedman of Aulus Nasennius, known from an inscription at Capua.
- Nasennia A. l., a freedwoman of Aulus Nasennius, known from an inscription at Capua.
- Gaius Nasennius Marcellus, a municipal official from the Roman Colonia at Capua.
- Gaius Nasennius C. l. Rufio, a freedman who set up a monument at Capua.
- Gaius Nasennius Felix, contributed money to build a temple at Ostia Antica.
- Gaius Nasennius Nasennianus, contributed money to build a temple at Ostia Antica.
- Gaius Nasennius Agathyrso, married Lucilia, and was the father of Gaius Nasennius Proculus. He and his family are buried at Ostia Antica.
- Gaius Nasennius C. f. Proculus, the son of Gaius Nasennius Agathyrso and Lucilia, married Terentia Acris, and was the father of Gaius. He built a family tomb at Ostia Antica.
- Gaius Nasennius C. f. C. n. Proculus, the son of Gaius and Terentia Acris, died at the age of six, and was buried in the family tomb at Ostia Antica.
- Gaius Nasennius, named in a funerary inscription from Ostia Antica.
- Nasennius Apollinaris, responded at length to questions put to him by the jurist Julius Paulus.

== See also ==
- List of Roman gentes

== Bibliography ==
- Marcus Tullius Cicero, Epistulae ad Brutum.
- Dictionary of Greek and Roman Biography and Mythology, William Smith, ed., Little, Brown and Company, Boston (1849).
- Theodor Mommsen et alii, Corpus Inscriptionum Latinarum (The Body of Latin Inscriptions, abbreviated CIL), Berlin-Brandenburgische Akademie der Wissenschaften (1853–present).
- René Cagnat et alii, L'Année épigraphique (The Year in Epigraphy, abbreviated AE), Presses Universitaires de France (1888–present).
- Paul von Rohden, Elimar Klebs, & Hermann Dessau, Prosopographia Imperii Romani (The Prosopography of the Roman Empire, abbreviated PIR), Berlin (1898).
