= Middlebrow =

Art qualification

The term middlebrow describes middlebrow art, which is easily accessible art, usually popular literature, and middlebrow people who use the arts to acquire the social capital of "culture and class" and thus a good reputation. First used in the British satire magazine Punch in 1925, the term middlebrow is the intellectual, intermediary brow between the highbrow and the lowbrow forms of culture; all of these terms are borrowed from the pseudoscience of phrenology.

== History ==
The concept is metaphorically derived from 19th-century phrenology, in which a “high” brow was associated with intelligence and a “low” brow with its absence. Unlike either extreme, the middlebrow came to be associated with mediocrity, conformity, and aspirational middle-class taste. The term gained prominence in the 1920s and 1930s, notably through critical attacks by figures such as Virginia Woolf, who characterized middlebrow culture as neither fully committed to art nor to life, but as motivated by concerns of status, money, and prestige. Despite sustained critical hostility, middlebrow literature expanded significantly during the inter-war period, particularly in the form of widely read novels aimed at an educated but non-elite audience. In the late 20th and early 21st centuries, the term has been reassessed by scholars, who argue that middlebrow culture represents a large and previously neglected area of cultural consumption.

== Modernism ==
In the mid 20th century, the term middlebrow became a pejorative usage in the modernist cultural criticism written by Dwight Macdonald, Virginia Woolf, and Russell Lynes, which pejorative usage placed popular culture at the margin of mainstream culture in favour of high culture. Culturally, the middlebrow sensibility appears as a forced and ineffective attempt at cultural and intellectual achievement by way of popular literature that emphasises emotional and sentimental connections, rather than intellectualism and an appreciation of literary innovation. In contrast, the philosophy of postmodernism readily perceives the cultural advantages of the perspective of the middlebrow person who is aware of and likes high culture, but effectively balances the aesthetic demands of high art with the cultural demands of daily life in the world.

== Virginia Woolf ==
In 1941, Virginia Woolf derided the middlebrow mentality in an un-posted letter to the editor of the New Statesman & Nation, concerning a radio broadcast that attacked the highbrows of British society as people intellectually detached from everyday life. The letter-to-the-editor was posthumously published in the essay collection The Death of the Moth and Other Essays (1942).

As a social critic, Woolf criticizes middlebrows as petty purveyors of highbrow culture for their own shallow benefit. Rather than select and read books for their intrinsic cultural value, middlebrow people select and read books they are told are the best books to read: "We highbrows read what we like and do what we like and praise what we like." Middlebrows are concerned with appearances, with how their social activities make them appear to the community, unlike the highbrows, the avant-garde men and women who act according to their commitment to the beauty and forms of art, and to values and integrity. Likewise, a lowbrow person is devoted to a singular interest, a person "of thoroughbred vitality who rides his body in pursuit of a living at a gallop across life"; and, therefore, the lowbrow are equally worthy of reverence, as they, too, are living for what they intrinsically know as valuable.

Instead of such social and intellectual freedom, the middlebrows are betwixt and between, people whom Woolf characterises as "in pursuit of no single object, neither Art itself nor life itself, but both mixed indistinguishably, and rather nastily, with money, fame, power, or prestige". The middlebrow value system rewards quick gains through books already designated as 'Classic literature' and as 'Great literature', but never of their own choosing, because "to buy living art requires living taste". The critic Woolf concludes that the middlebrow class are culturally meretricious – a human condition less demanding than personal authenticity.

== "Highbrow, Lowbrow, Middlebrow" ==
In the essay "Highbrow, Lowbrow, Middlebrow" (1949), Russell Lynes satirized Virginia Woolf's highbrow scorn for middlebrow people voiced in her editorial letter. Quoting Woolf and other highbrows, such as art critic Clement Greenberg, Lynes said that the subtle distinctions that Woolf found significant among the levels of brows were just a means of upholding an artificial cultural superiority over the popular culture consumed by the middlebrow and the lowbrow strata of society. Lyne specifically criticised Woolf's claim that the consumer products used by a person identified his and her socio-cultural stratum in society; in the letter, Woolf identified consumer products that, in her opinion, identified the user as a middlebrow person.

Lynes then distinguished the sub-levels of the intellectual brow and divided the middlebrow into the upper-middlebrow and the lower-middlebrow. The upper-middlebrow patronage of the arts makes possible the cultural activities of the highbrow stratum, such as museums, symphonic orchestras, opera companies, and publishing houses, which are administrated by members of the upper-middlebrow stratum. The lower middlebrow use the arts as a means of self-improvement (personal and professional) because they are "hell-bent on improving their minds, as well as their fortunes". Members of the lower-middlebrow stratum also live the simple, easy life offered in advertisements wherein "lower middlebrow-ism" was "a world that smells of soap". Lynes concludes that Woolf's social-class opinions as an intellectual delineate an intellectually perfect world without middlebrow people.

Later, in a Life magazine article, Lynes distinguished among the right foods and the right furniture, the right clothes and the right arts for lowbrow people, for middlebrow people, and for highbrow people. In American culture, Lynes’ explanation of the sociologic particulars of social capital and the distinctions of social class provoked much social insecurity among Americans, as they worried about how their favourite things determined their actual social class and cultural stratum.

== Priestley's defense ==
As an intellectual, J. B. Priestley sought to create a positive cultural space for the concept of the middlebrow, which would be characterised by earnestness, friendliness, and ethical concern; and couched his defence of the middlebrow in terms of radio stations, praising the BBC Home Service for cosiness and plainness, a cultural space midway between the Light Programme and the Third Programme, "between the raucous lowbrows and the lisping highbrows [there] is a fine gap, meant for the middle or broadbrows . . . our homely fashion".

In the struggles and competitions among the intelligentsia for the attention of readers and to generate cultural capital, Virginia Woolf responded to Priestly's defence of the middlebrow by dubbing the BBC Home Service as the "Betwixt and Between Company".

== "Masscult and Midcult" ==
Dwight Macdonald's critique of middlebrow culture, "Masscult and Midcult" (1960), associated the modern industrial drive, away from specialization and the folk, with creating mass-market arts that render men, women, and children into anonymous consumers of the arts. In the U.S., highbrow culture is associated with specialization for the connoisseurs, while lowbrow culture entails authentic folk products made for specific communities, such as the working class. Masscult (mass culture) copies and manipulates both the high and the low traditions, with factory-created products, made without innovation or care, expressly for the market, "to please the crowd by any means", thereby creating an American society in which "a pluralistic culture cannot exist", wherein the rule is cultural homogeneity.

In contrast, Midcult (middle culture) came about with middlebrow culture, and dangerously copies and adulterates high culture, by way of "a tepid ooze of Midcult", which threatens high culture, with dramaturgy, literature, and architecture, such as Our Town (1938), The Old Man and the Sea (1952), and American collegiate gothic architecture.

The Middlebrow "pretends to respect the standards of High Culture, while, in fact, it waters them down and vulgarizes them". Macdonald recommended a separation of the brows, so that "the few who care about good writing, painting, music, architecture, philosophy, etc. have their High Culture, and don't fuzz up the distinction with the Midcult".

== Marketed middlebrow ==
Oprah's Book Club and the Book-of-the-Month Club are middlebrow products marketed to deliver the classical and highbrow literature to the middle class. The middlebrow nature of Oprah's Book Club was highlighted by the novelist Jonathan Franzen, after his 2001 book The Corrections was selected as Oprah's book of the month. Franzen publicly complained that the selection was inconsistent with his place in "the high art literary tradition" as distinct from "entertaining books", though Franzen never used the term “middlebrow” during the kerfuffle and later claimed not to know what it meant. In a 1996 essay in Harper's Magazine, Franzen lamented book clubs for "treating literature like a cruciferous vegetable that could be choked down only with a spoonful of socializing".

In A Feeling for Books (1997), a history of the Book-of-the-Month Club, from its establishment in 1926 to the 1980s, when it was entirely commercialised, Janice Radway said that middlebrow culture is not just a simulacrum of highbrow taste, but, instead, has defined itself in defiance of avant-garde high culture.

== Contemporary middlebrow ==
Slate Magazine suggests that the late 2000s and early 2010s could potentially be considered the "golden age of middlebrow art"—pointing to television shows Breaking Bad, Mad Men, The Sopranos and The Wire and novels Freedom, The Marriage Plot and A Visit from the Goon Squad. Slate also defines the films of Aaron Sorkin as middlebrow. Some argue that Slate itself is middlebrow journalism.

In a March 2012 article for Jewish Ideas Daily, Peodair Leihy described the work of poet and songwriter Leonard Cohen as "a kind of pop—upper-middle-brow to lower-high-brow, to be sure, but pop nonetheless". This aesthetic was further theorized in an essay from November that year for The American Scholar that saw William Deresiewicz propose the addition of "upper middle brow", a culture falling between masscult and midcult. He defined it as "infinitely subtler than Midcult. It is post- rather than pre-ironic, its sentimentality hidden by a veil of cool. It is edgy, clever, knowing, stylish, and formally inventive."

In The New Yorker, Macy Halford characterizes Harper's Magazine and The New Yorker itself as "often [being] viewed as prime examples of the middlebrow: both magazines are devoted to the high but also to making it accessible to many; to bringing ideas that might remain trapped in ivory towers and academic books, or in high-art (or film or theatre) scenes, into the pages of a relatively inexpensive periodical that can be bought at bookstores and newsstands across the country (and now on the Internet)." She also notes the internet's effect on the middlebrow debate: "the Internet is forcing us to rethink (again) what 'middlebrow' means: in an era when the highest is as accessible as the lowest—accessible in the sense that both are only a click away [...] —we actually have to think anew about how to walk that middle line." Halford describes Wikipedia itself as "itself a kind of middlebrow product" and links to its "Middlebrow" entry "because it actually provides a smart summary".

According to Diana Holmes, middlebrow literature is characterized by a preference for realist and representational narrative strategies, immersive storytelling, coherent plots, and psychologically plausible characters, as opposed to the formal experimentation associated with literary modernism. While offering entertainment through engaging narratives, it often presents itself as serious, topical, and morally or cognitively enriching.

== See also ==
- Babbittry
- Book sales club
- Bourgeoisie
- Harold Nicolson
- Mass culture
- Middle of the road (music)
- Peak TV
- Rose Macaulay
- Saturday Night Theatre
- Social climber
- The Good Companions
- The Movement
- Warwick Deeping
