= Freshwater (play) =

1935 play by Virginia Woolf; best known for being her only piece for theatre

Freshwater: A comedy
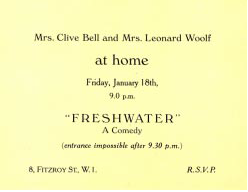
- Invitation card for first performance 1935
- Written by: Virginia Woolf
- Genre: Comedy

Premiere
- Date premiered: 18 January 1935
- Place premiered: Fitzroy Street, London

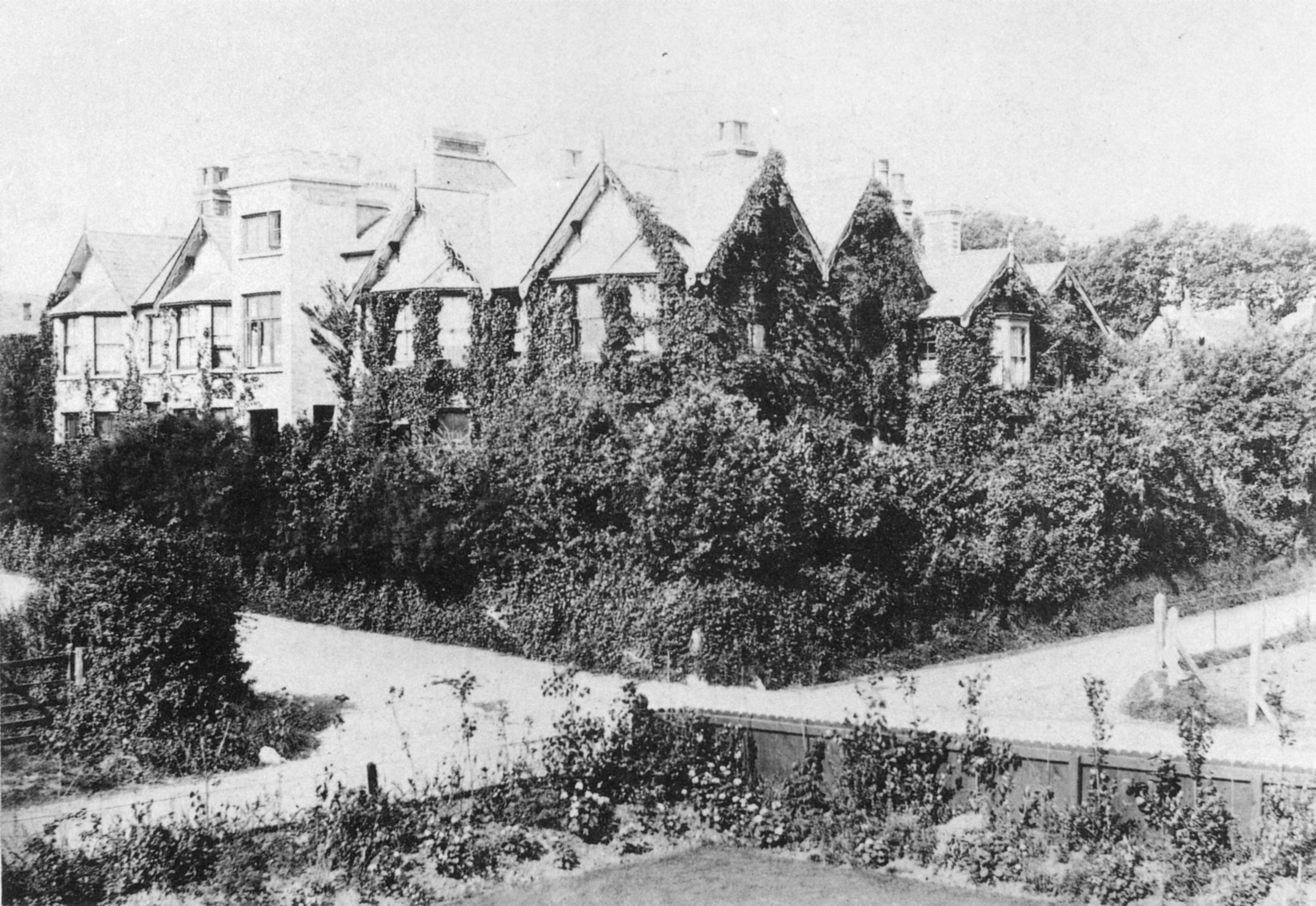
Dimbola Lodge 1871, the setting for Freshwater

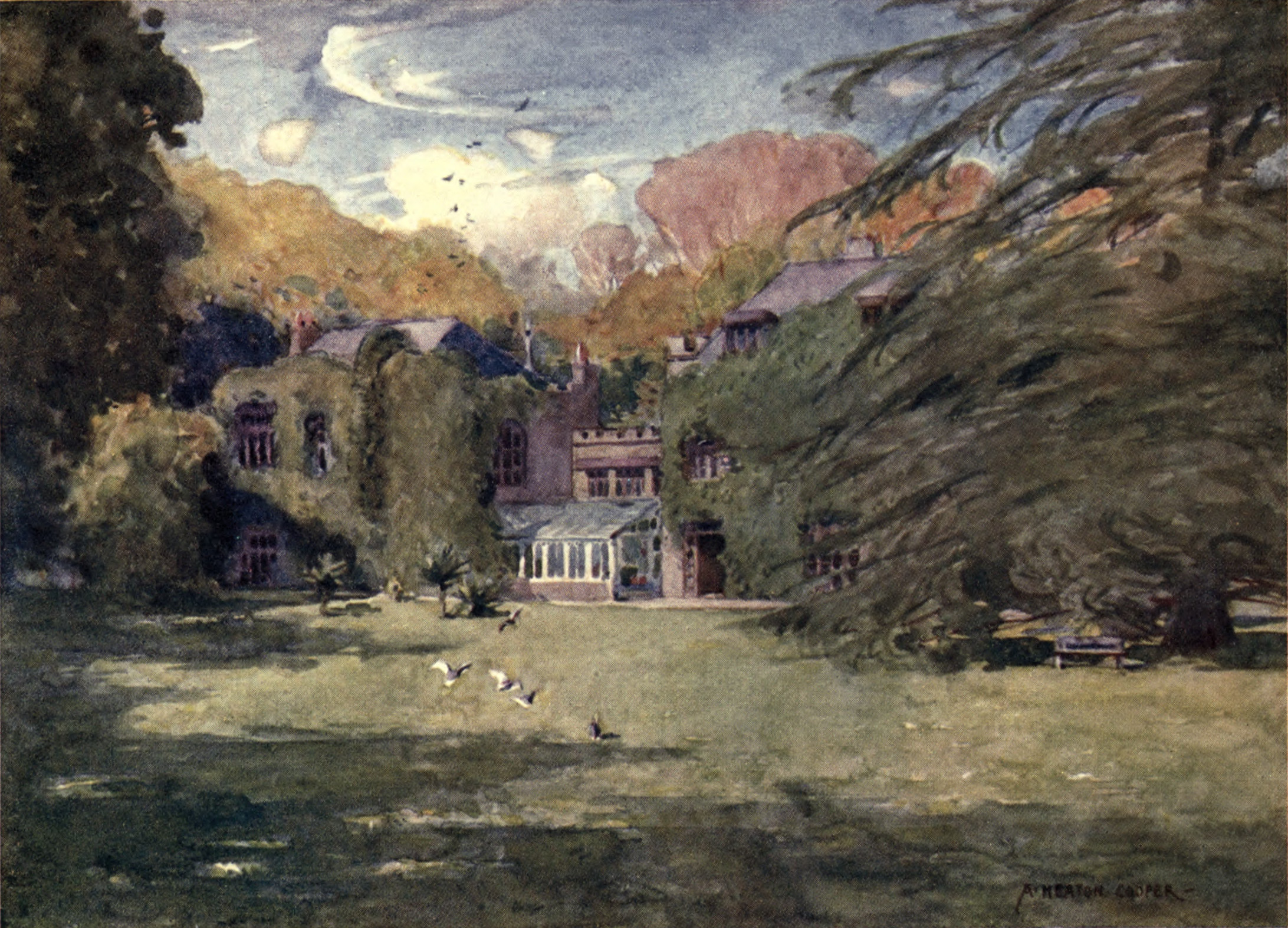
Tennyson's home, Farringford House at Freshwater

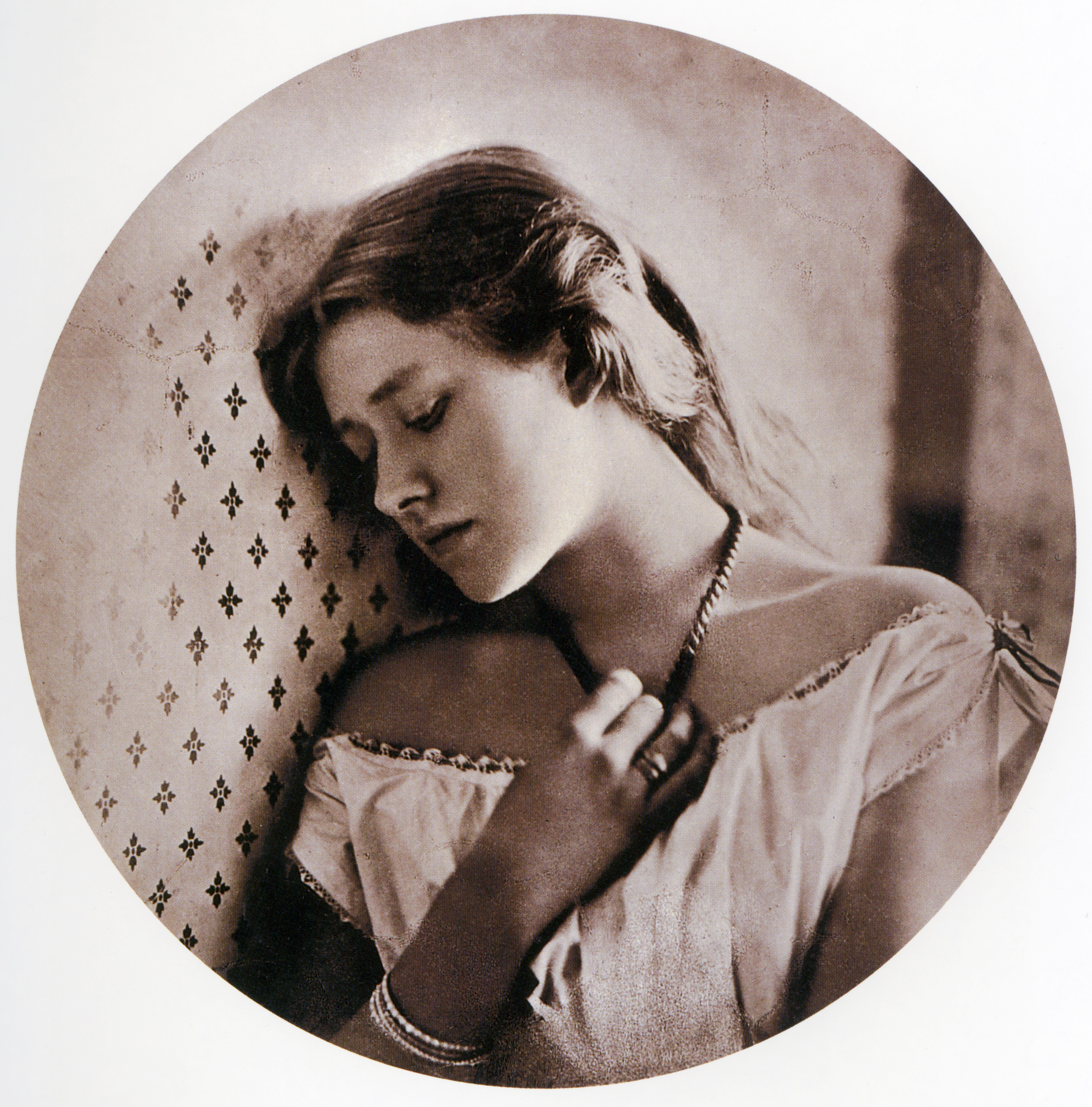
Ellen Terry by Cameron 1864

Freshwater: A comedy is a play written and produced by Virginia Woolf in 1935, and the only play she wrote. Although only performed once in her lifetime, it has been translated into many languages and produced in many countries since. Alfred Lord Tennyson appears as a character in this play.

== History ==
Virginia Woolf researched the life of her great-aunt, the photographer Julia Margaret Cameron, publishing her findings in an essay titled Pattledom (1925), and later in her introduction to her 1926 edition of Cameron's photographs. She had begun work on a play based on an episode in Cameron's life in 1923, but abandoned it. Finally it was performed on 18 January 1935 at the studio of her sister, Vanessa Bell on Fitzroy Street in 1935. Woolf directed it herself, and the cast were mainly members of the Bloomsbury Group, including Vanessa, her daughter Angelica Garnett, Virginia's husband Leonard and Duncan Grant, Angelica's father. Freshwater is a short three act comedy satirizing the Victorian era. It was not performed again in Woolf's lifetime. It was found among Leonard Woolf's papers after his death in 1969 and was not published till 1976, when the Hogarth Press produced an edition, edited by Lucio Ruotolo, who was living in Virginia Woolf's home, Monk's House, at the time. The edition was illustrated by Edward Gorey under the pseudonym Loretta Trezzo.

== Dramatis personae ==
- Julia Margaret Cameron
- Charles Henry Hay Cameron, her husband
- G. F. Watts, painter
- Ellen Terry, actress, his wife
- Lord Tennyson, poet, a neighbour
- Mr Craig
- Mary Magdalene, housemaid

== Plot ==
The play is named after Freshwater, Isle of Wight, where Julia Margaret Cameron lived in a somewhat bohemian atmosphere at her home, Dimbola Lodge, surrounded by a number of artists and literary figures, including George Frederick Watts and Tennyson in the 1860s. Tennyson's nearby home, Farringford was another artistic centre. The plot revolves around the attempts by the young actress Ellen Terry to escape from her marriage to the much older Watts, partly family history, partly mocking the conventions of the Victorian times that the Bloomsbury group had fought to escape. The Camerons are set to embark for India, while both Mrs Cameron and Watts are intent on portraying Ellen in their respective media. Ellen on the other hand views a young naval lieutenant as her escape, with an offer to escape to Bloomsbury. This collapses a number of historic events into a single afternoon.

== Performance ==
The 1935 version had a rehearsed reading in Melbourne, Australia by Performing Arts Projects at the Linden Gallery in 1989. In New York in 2009, both the 1923 and 1935 versions were combined for the first time in an Off-Broadway production to celebrate Woolf's 128th birthday, Charles Isherwood praising the wordplay. In London the play was performed in Virginia Woolf's former home, 46 Gordon Square (now part of the School of Arts, Birkbeck College) in 2012. Freshwater has also been performed at Monk's House in Rodmell, Sussex.

The play has been translated into French (1982), Spanish (1980) and German (2017). It was performed in Paris at the Centre Pompidou in 1982, and in Mainz, Germany in 1994. The French production was revived in New York in 1983, starring Eugène Ionesco, Alain Robbe-Grillet, Nathalie Sarraute, Joyce Mansour, Guy Dumur and Florence Delay.

== Reception ==
Although a slight work not intended for publication, and easily dismissed as frivolous, it has been given a larger meaning when placed in the broader context of Woolf's work and views. For beneath the comedic elements, there is an exploration of both generational change and artistic freedom. Both Cameron and Woolf fought against the class and gender dynamics of Victorianism and the play shows links to both To the Lighthouse and A Room of One's Own that would follow. Ellen's flight to Bloomsbury symbolising freedom from patriarchy.

== Bibliography ==
- Brackenbury, Rosalind (2018). Miss Stephen's Apprenticeship: How Virginia Stephen Became Virginia Woolf. University of Iowa Press. ISBN 978-1-60938-551-4.
- Cameron, Julia Margaret (1973) [1926 Hogarth Press, edited by Leonard and Virginia Woolf]. Powell, Tristram (ed.). Victorian photographs of famous men & fair women. Introductions by Virginia Woolf and Roger Fry (Revised ed.). D. R. Godine. ISBN 978-0-87923-076-0. (Digital edition)
- Helmore, Kristin; Polk, Grace D. (1 November 1983). "Virginia Woolf would've loved NYU's 'Freshwater'". The Christian Science Monitor.
- Hetrick, Adam (5 January 2009). "Two Versions of Virginia Woolf's Freshwater Are Combined for World Premiere in NYC; Cast Announced". Playbill.
- Hoffman, Eva (22 October 1983). "Rare cast from France in a rare Woolf play". The New York Times.
- Isherwood, Charles (25 January 2009). "Proof That Virginia Woolf Did Have a Light Side". The New York Times.
- Monks, Aoife Monks (23 May 2012). "Virginia Woolf's play exposes the silly side of the Bloomsbury group". The Guardian.
- Swenson, Kristine (26 October 2017). "Hothouse Victorians: Art and Agency in Freshwater". Open Cultural Studies. 1 (1). doi:10.1515/culture-2017-0017.
- Usui, Masami (2007). "Julia Margaret Cameron as a Feminist Precursor of Virginia Woolf" (PDF). Doshisha Studies in English. 80 (3): 59–83.
- Wixson, Christopher (27 November 2013). "The Theatrical Woolf". English Literature in Transition, 1880–1920. 57 (2): 292–295. ISSN 1559-2715.
- Woolf, Virginia (1986–2011). McNeillie, Andrew; Clarke, Stuart N. (eds.). The Essays of Virginia Woolf 6 vols. Random House.
- Farfan, Penny (2004). Woman, Modernism, Performance. Cambridge University.
  - — (1994). The Essays of Virginia Woolf Volume Four 1925–1928. Harcourt Brace Jovanovich. ISBN 978-0-7012-0666-6.

Websites

- Lunden, Jeff (25 January 2009). "In 'Freshwater,' A Lighter Side Of Virginia Woolf". NPR.
- Maggio, Paula (13 August 2010). "Gorey illustrations of Woolf in Freshwater".
- Wilson, J.J.; Barrett, Eileen, eds. (Summer 2003). "Lucio Ruotolo 1927–2003" (PDF). Virginia Woolf Miscellany. Southern Connecticut State University. (includes invitation to first performance in 1935 and Lucio Ruotolo's introduction to the 1976 Hogarth Press edition)
- "'Freshwater' play by Virginia Woolf". StayLewes. 12 August 2017.

Editions

- Woolf, Virginia (2017). Bloomsbury & Freshwater. trans. Tobias Schwartz. Berlin: Aviva Verlag. ISBN 978-3-932338-92-2.
- — (2017a). Freshwater by Virginia Woolf - Delphi Classics (Illustrated). Delphi Classics (Parts Edition). ISBN 978-1-78877-058-3.
- — (2017) [1935]. Freshwater: A Comedy by Virginia Woolf (The 1923 & 1935 Editions). Musaicum Books. ISBN 978-80-272-3556-8.
- — (1976). Ruotolo, Lucio (ed.). Freshwater: a comedy. Illustrations: Edward Gorey. Harcourt Brace Jovanovich.
  - Anonymous (28 June 1976). "Freshwater: A Comedy". Kirkus Reviews (Review).
