= Between the Acts =

1941 final novel by Virginia Woolf

- Front cover of the first edition
- Author: Virginia Woolf
- Cover artist: Vanessa Bell
- Language: English
- Genre: Theatre-fiction
- Set in: England
- Publisher: Hogarth Press
- Publication date: 7 August 1941
- Publication place: England
- Media type: Print

Between the Acts is the final novel by Virginia Woolf. It was published shortly after her death in 1941. Although the manuscript had been completed, Woolf had yet to make final revisions.

The book describes the mounting, performance, and audience of a play at a festival in a small English village, just before the outbreak of the Second World War. Since the play is inside the story, much of the novel is written in verse, and it is thus one of Woolf's most lyrical works. Because of its focus on theatrical performance, it has been discussed as theatre-fiction, which Graham Wolfe explains as "referring to novels and stories that engage in concrete and sustained ways with theatre as artistic practice and industry".

== Plot ==
The story takes place in a country house somewhere in England, just before the Second World War, over the course of a single day. It is the day when the annual pageant is to be performed on the grounds of the house. The pageant is traditionally a celebration of English history, and it is attended by the entire local community.

The owner of the house is Bartholomew Oliver, a widower and retired Indian Army officer. His sister Lucy Swithin, who is also living in the house, is slightly eccentric but kind. Bartholomew has a son, Giles, who has a job in London and is restless and frustrated. Giles has two children with his wife Isa, who has lost interest in him. Isa is attracted to a local gentleman farmer, Rupert Haines, although the relationship goes no further than eye contact. Mrs. Manresa and her friend William Dodge arrive and stay for the pageant. The pageant has been written by Miss La Trobe, a strange and domineering spinster.

The day is interspersed with events leading up to the pageant. Lucy fusses around making preparations for the decorations and the food. Bartholomew frightens his grandson by jumping out at him from behind a newspaper and then calls him a coward when he cries. Mrs. Manresa flirts provocatively with Bartholomew and Giles. William Dodge, assumed by the others to be homosexual, is the subject of homophobic thoughts by many of the others but is friendly with Lucy.

The pageant occurs in the evening, and it has three main parts which are broken up by intermissions, during which the audience members interact with one another. Following a prologue by a child who represents England, the first scene is a Shakespearean scene with romantic dialogue. The second scene is a parody of a restoration comedy, and the third scene is a panorama of Victorian triumph based on a policeman directing the traffic in Hyde Park. The final scene is entitled "Ourselves", at which point Miss La Trobe shocks the audience by having the cast turn mirrors on them.

When the pageant ends and the audience disperses, Miss La Trobe retreats to the village pub and, brooding over what she perceives to be the pageant's failure, begins to plan her next drama. As darkness descends, cloaking the country house, Giles and Isa are left alone, presumably resulting in conflict and reconciliation.

== Style ==
The novel "sums up and magnifies Woolf's chief preoccupations: the transformation of life through art, sexual ambivalence, and meditation on the themes of flux of time and life, presented simultaneously as corrosion and rejuvenation—all set in a highly imaginative and symbolic narrative encompassing almost all of English history." It is the most lyrical of all her works, not only in feeling but in style, being chiefly written in verse. While Woolf's work can be understood as consistently in dialogue with the Bloomsbury Group, particularly due to its tendency (informed by G.E. Moore, among others) towards doctrinaire rationalism, it is not a simple recapitulation of the coterie's ideals.

== Publication history ==
Woolf completed Between the Acts in November 1940 while living at Monk's House in Sussex. Her biography of Roger Fry had been published in July, and she had been disappointed in its reception. The Woolfs' London homes had been destroyed in The Blitz in September and October. Woolf fell into a depression before her suicide on 28 March 1941, and the novel was published posthumously later that year.

At the time of her death Woolf had yet to correct the typescript of the novel, and a number of critics consider it to be unfinished. The book has a note by Woolf's husband, Leonard Woolf:

The MS. of this book had been completed, but had not been finally revised for the printer, at the time of Virginia Woolf's death. She would not, I believe, have made any large or material alterations in it, though she would probably have made a good many small corrections or revisions before passing the final proofs.

== Bibliography ==
- Beja, Morris (1985). Critical essays on Virginia Woolf. Boston, Mass.: G.K. Hall. ISBN 978-0-8161-8753-9.
- Bell, Quentin (1972). Virginia Woolf: A Biography. Harcourt Brace Jovanovich. ISBN 978-0-15-693580-7.
  - Vol. I: Virginia Stephen 1882 to 1912. London: Hogarth Press. 1972
  - Vol. II: Virginia Woolf 1912 to 1941. London: Hogarth Press. 1972.
- Himmelfarb, Gertrude (1 February 1985). "From Clapham to Bloomsbury: a genealogy of morals". Commentary. archived version
- Hussey, Mark (2011). “Introduction.” Between the Acts. Cambridge University Press, xxxiv-lxxiv.
- Lee, Hermione (1999) [1996]. Virginia Woolf. Vintage Books. ISBN 978-0-375-70136-8.
- Shukla, Bhaskar A. (2007). Feminism : from Mary Wollstonecraft to Betty Friedan. New Delhi: Sarup & Sons. ISBN 978-81-7625-754-1.
- Todd, Pamela (2001). Bloomsbury at Home. Pavilion. ISBN 978-1-86205-428-8.
- Wolfe, Graham (2020). Theatre-Fiction in Britain from Henry James to Doris Lessing: Writing in the Wings. Routledge. p. 2. ISBN 9781000124361.
- Woolf, Virginia (2014) [1941]. Between the Acts. Houghton Mifflin Harcourt. ISBN 978-0-544-45178-0.
- Woolf, Virginia (2017) [1940]. Roger Fry: A Biography. Musaicum Books. ISBN 978-80-272-3516-2.
