= Monday or Tuesday =

1921 short story collection by Virginia Woolf

- First edition (UK)
- Author: Virginia Woolf
- Illustrator: Vanessa Bell
- Language: English
- Publisher: Hogarth Press (UK); Harcourt Brace (US)
- Publication date: 1921
- Publication place: United Kingdom
- Media type: Print
- Pages: 91

Monday or Tuesday is a 1921 short story collection by Virginia Woolf published by The Hogarth Press. 1000 copies were printed with four full-page woodcuts by Vanessa Bell. Leonard Woolf called it one of the worst printed books ever published because of the typographical mistakes in it. Most mistakes were corrected for the US edition published by Harcourt Brace. It contains eight stories:

- "A Haunted House"
- "A Society"
- "Monday or Tuesday"
- "An Unwritten Novel" – previously appeared in the London Mercury in 1920
- "The String Quartet"
- "Blue & Green"
- "Kew Gardens" – previously published separately
- "The Mark on the Wall" – previously appeared in Two Stories (1917)

Six of the stories were later published by Leonard Woolf in the posthumous collection A Haunted House (those excluded were "A Society" and "Blue & Green").

== Title ==
In her 1919 work "Modern Fiction", Virginia Woolf explains her new approach to writing:

Examine for a moment an ordinary mind on an ordinary day. The mind receives a myriad impressions—trivial, fantastic, evanescent, or engraved with the sharpness of steel. From all sides they come, an incessant shower of innumerable atoms; and as they fall, as they shape themselves into the life of Monday or Tuesday

This last phrase "the life of Monday or Tuesday" is what Woolf believed to be at the core of fiction; and from it came the title of this, her first short story collection, and the only selection she published herself.
