= Trekkie Parsons =

English artist and lithographer

- Born: Marjorie Tulip Ritchie; 15 June 1902; Colony of Natal
- Died: 24 July 1995 (aged 93); Lewes, Sussex, England
- Occupation(s): Artist, lithographer
- Spouses: Peter A. Brooker (m. 1926; div. 1934) Ian Parsons (m. 1934)
- Partner(s): Leonard Woolf (1941–1969; his death)

Trekkie Ritchie Parsons (née Marjorie Tulip Ritchie; 15 June 1902 – 24 July 1995) was an English artist and lithographer, perhaps best known as the (perhaps chaste) lover of Leonard Woolf after his wife Virginia's death.

== Background ==
Trekkie Ritchie Parsons was born Marjorie Tulip Ritchie, in 1902 in Durban, Colony of Natal. She studied at the Slade School of Fine Art in London.

Her parents, Allan McGregor Ritchie (b. 1870, Edinburgh) and Sarah Maria Tulip (b. 1867, Stockton on Tees) married in Cumberland in 1894. When her sister Alice Ritchie (an author of children's books that Trekkie illustrated) was born in 1898, the family had moved to Durban where Allan was a practising architect until about 1914 when he enlisted for war service.

In 1917, the family came to England, and Trekkie attended school at Tunbridge Wells before entering, in 1920, the Slade School of Fine Art, to study with Philip Steer and Henry Tonks. In 1926, she married Peter (Percy Alfred) Brooker, a fellow student at the Slade School. The marriage was short-lived, and in 1934 she married Ian Parsons, an editor at Chatto & Windus.

During World War II, she worked as part of the Fire Service, for a while as a Land Girl, and finally for Intelligence.

Known professionally as T. Ritchie, she was the author and illustrator of Bells across the Sand—A Book of Rhymes with Pictures which was published by her husband's firm circa 1944, lithographed throughout, and printed by Chiswick Press in the same style and size as Puffin Picture Books. She also illustrated, and designed the cover for, The Three Rings by Barbara Baker (Hogarth Press, 1944), and designed the cover for the British edition of Newbery Medal winner Johnny Tremain (Chatto & Windus, 1944). Her lithographic technique is in the style of Barnett Freedman.

Sometime between the world wars, Trekkie's sister Alice introduced her to Leonard and Virginia Woolf, leading figures in the Bloomsbury group of writers, critics, and artists. Two months after Virginia Woolf's death in 1941, Leonard visited Alice, who was dying of cancer, at Trekkie's house. He fell in love with Trekkie, and they began an unconventional relationship that lasted until his death in 1969. She often spent the week with Leonard and the weekend with her husband. She had holidays and acted as hostess for them both separately. She was Leonard's companion on trips to France, Greece, Israel, and Ceylon. She wrote many letters to Leonard when they were apart, published in 1974 as Love Letters: Leonard Woolf and Trekkie Ritchie Parsons. Despite their declared love and companionship, Trekkie insisted that the two had not been lovers. After his death, Leonard left Monk's House to Parsons who sold it to the University of Sussex. During Trekkie and Leonard's relationship, Trekkie's husband Ian established a long liaison with his Chatto & Windus colleague Norah Smallwood, whom Trekkie despised.

Trekkie died in 1995, at age 93, in Lewes, England.
