= Epistulae ad Atticum =

Letters from Cicero to Atticus

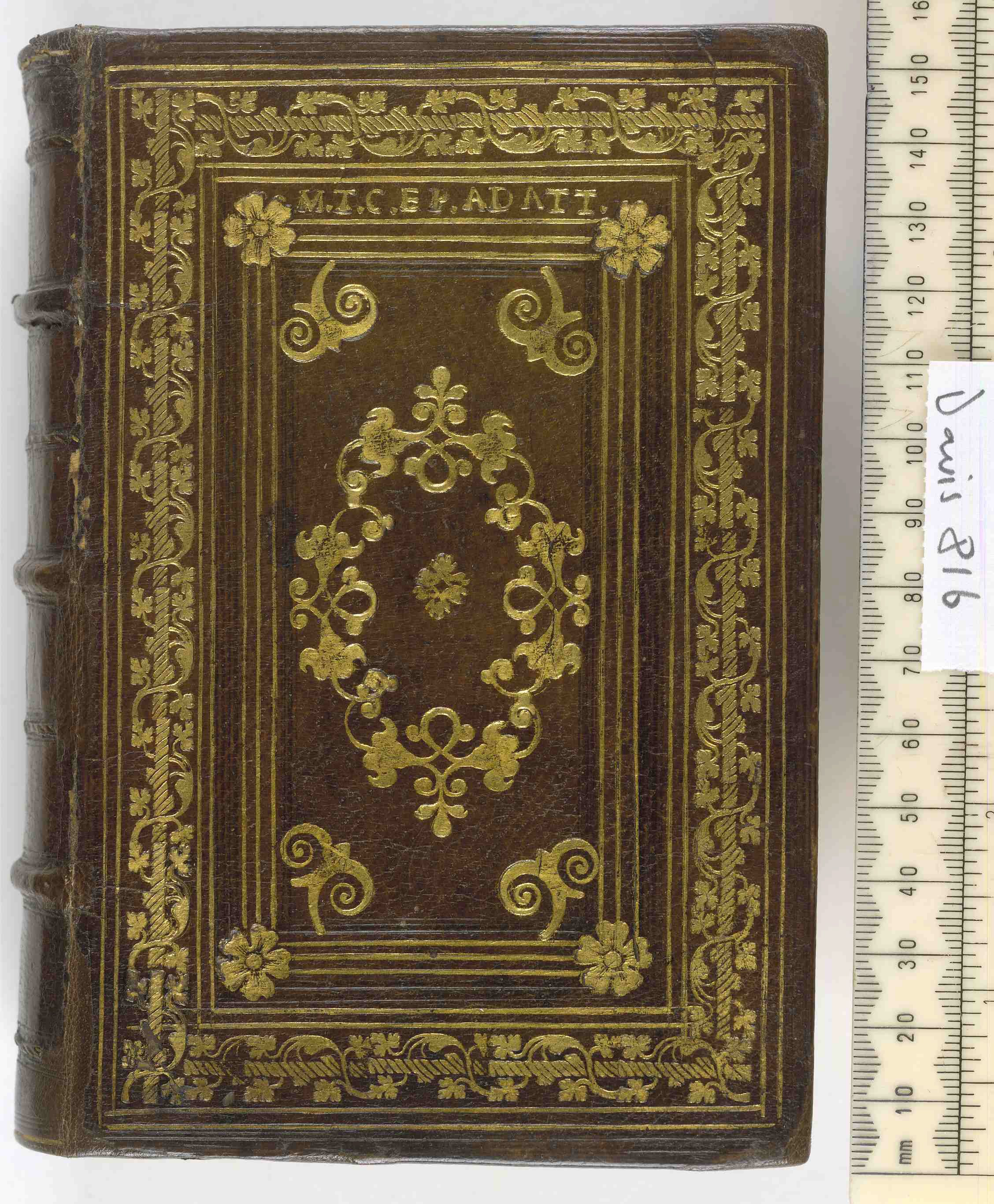
Cover of a 1561 Venetian edition, with the letters M.T.C. EP.AD ATT.

Epistulae ad Atticum (Latin for "Letters to Atticus") is a collection of letters from Roman politician and orator Marcus Tullius Cicero to his close friend Titus Pomponius Atticus between 68 and 43 BCE.

== Overview ==
Cicero and Atticus maintained a long and intimate friendship, with the biographer Cornelius Nepos remarking that “Marcus Cicero loved [Atticus] above all men, so that not even his brother Quintus was dearer or more closely united to him.”

Of Cicero’s 813 surviving letters, 454 are addressed to Atticus. These letters provide a candid, personal record of Cicero’s daily life and political concerns, often regarded as a form of private journal. Together with Cicero's other letters, they are considered the most reliable sources of information for the period leading up to the fall of the Roman Republic.

A notable absence of early references to these particular letters suggest that they may not have been published until the middle of the first century CE, significantly later than Cicero's other letters and quite some time after the deaths of both Cicero (43 BCE) and Atticus (32 BCE).

== Rediscovery ==
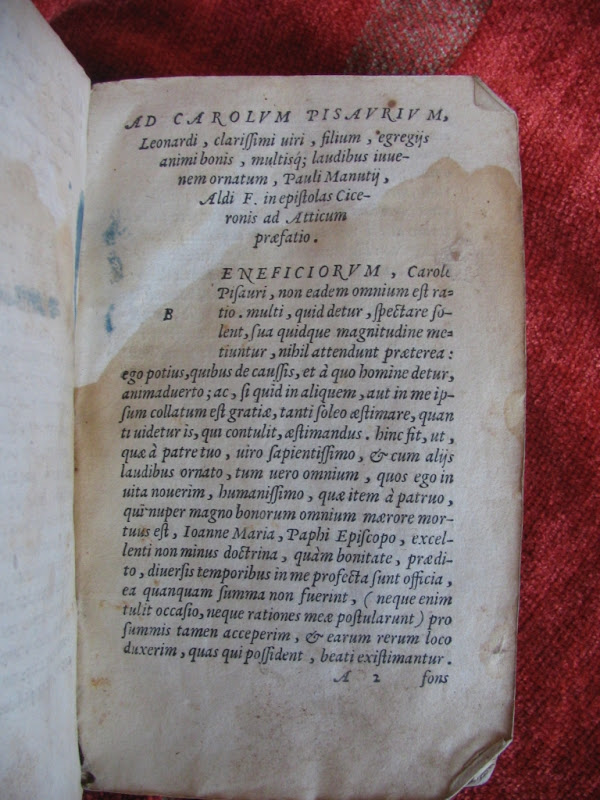
The first page of Paolo Manuzio's 1558 Venetian edition.

A manuscript containing the collection, along with Epistulae ad Quintum Fratrem, and Epistulae ad Brutum, was rediscovered in 1345 by Petrarch who found it in the Chapter Library of Verona and commissioned a copy. Although both the original manuscript and Petrarch’s copy have since been lost, the text became widely known through later editions, notably that printed in Venice by Paolo Manuzio in 1558. A copy made for Coluccio Salutati is preserved today in the Laurentian Library in Florence.
