= Flush: A Biography =

1933 biography by Virginia Woolf

- First edition
- Author: Virginia Woolf
- Language: English
- Genre: Fiction/non-fiction cross-genre
- Publisher: Hogarth Press
- Publication date: 1933
- Publication place: United Kingdom
- Media type: Print
- Pages: 163 pp
- OCLC: 542060
- Dewey Decimal: 823/.9/12
- LC Class: PR6045.O72 F5 1976

Flush: A Biography, an imaginative biography of Elizabeth Barrett Browning's cocker spaniel, is a cross-genre blend of fiction and nonfiction by Virginia Woolf published in 1933. Written after the completion of her emotionally draining The Waves, the work returned Woolf to the imaginative consideration of English history that she had begun in Orlando: A Biography, and to which she would return in Between the Acts.

== Themes ==
Commonly read as a modernist consideration of city life seen through the eyes of a dog, Flush serves as a harsh criticism of the supposedly unnatural ways of living in the city. The figure of Elizabeth Barrett Browning in the text is often read as an analogue for other female intellectuals, like Woolf herself, who suffered from illness, feigned or real, as a part of their status as female writers. Most insightful and experimental are Woolf's emotional and philosophical views expressed in Flush's thoughts. As he spends more time with Barrett Browning, Flush becomes emotionally and spiritually connected to the poet, and both begin to understand each other despite their language barriers. For Flush, smell is poetry, but for Barrett Browning, poetry is impossible without words. In Flush, Woolf examines the barriers that exist between woman and animal created by language, yet overcome through symbolic actions.

The book, due to its subject matter, has often been considered one of her less serious artistic endeavours; however, she uses her distinctive stream of consciousness style to experiment with a non-human perspective. In some places, the novella plays with realism by allowing Flush an improbable amount of perception for a canine (Flush seems to grasp some idea of social class in humans, a concept recurrently criticised in the story as he becomes more "democratic" later in life), and can "talk" to other dogs on the street. At other times, the reader is forced to interpret events from the dog's limited knowledge (Flush sees his owner agitated over markings on a paper and cannot understand that she is in love).

For material, Woolf drew primarily on Barrett Browning's two poems on dogs ("To Flush, My Dog" and "Flush or Faunus") and on the published correspondence of the poet and her husband, Robert Browning. From this material, Woolf creates a biography that works on three levels. It is overtly a biography of a dog's life. Since this dog is of interest primarily for its owner, the work is also an impressionistic biography of Elizabeth Barrett during the most dramatic years of her life. At this level, Flush mostly recapitulates the romantic legend of Barrett Browning's life: early confinement by a mysterious illness and a doting but tyrannical father; a passionate romance with an equally talented poet; an elopement that permanently estranges the father, but which allows Barrett Browning to find happiness and health in Italy. On a third level, the book gives Woolf an opportunity to return to some of her most frequent topics: the glory and misery of London; the Victorian mindset; class differences; and the ways in which women oppressed by "fathers and tyrants" may find freedom.

Woolf ostensibly uses the life of a dog as pointed social criticism, ranging across topics from feminism and environmentalism to class conflict. But the work also reflects her "expansive interest in non-human animals".

== Synopsis ==
This unusual biography traces the life of Flush from his carefree existence in the country, to his adoption by Elizabeth Barrett and his travails in London, leading up to his final days in a bucolic Italy. The story begins by alluding to Flush's pedigree and birth in the household of Barrett Browning's impecunious friend Mary Russell Mitford. Woolf emphasises the dog's conformity to the guidelines of The Kennel Club, using those guidelines as a symbol of class difference that recurs throughout the work. Declining an offer from the brother of Edward Bouverie Pusey for the puppy, Mitford gave Flush to Elizabeth, then convalescent in a back room of the family house on Wimpole Street in London.

Flush leads a restrained but happy life with the poet until she meets Robert Browning; the introduction of love into Barrett Browning's life improves her health tremendously, but leaves the forgotten dog heartbroken. Woolf draws on passages from the letters to depict Flush's attempted mutinies: that is, he attempts to bite Browning, who remains unharmed.

The drama of the courtship is interrupted by Flush's dognapping. While accompanying Barrett Browning shopping, he is snatched by a thief and taken to the nearby rookery St Giles. This episode, a conflation of three real times on which Flush was stolen, ends when the poet, over her family's objections, pays the robbers six guineas (£6.30) to have the dog returned. It provides Woolf the opportunity for an extended meditation on the poverty of mid-century London, and on the blinkered indifference of many of the city's wealthy residents.

After his rescue, Flush is reconciled to his owner's future husband, and he accompanies them to Pisa and Florence. In these chapters, his own experiences are described equally with Barrett Browning's, as Woolf warms to the theme of the former invalid rejuvenated by her escape from paternal control. Barrett Browning's first pregnancy and the marriage of her maid, Lily Wilson, are described; Flush himself is represented as becoming more egalitarian in the presence of the mongrel dogs of Italy.

In the last chapters, Woolf describes a return to London after the death of Barrett Browning's father; she also touches on husband and wife's enthusiasm for the Risorgimento and for spiritualism. Flush's death, indeed, is described in terms of the strange Victorian interest in knocking tables: "He had been alive; he was now dead. That was all. The drawing-room table, strangely enough, stood perfectly still."
