= Granite and Rainbow =

Granite and Rainbow is a posthumous collection of twenty-five essays on the art of fiction and the art of biography by Virginia Woolf. It was first published by Harcourt Brace in 1958. It includes an editorial note by Leonard Woolf.

It is not to be confused with Granite and Rainbow: The Hidden Life of Virginia Woolf by Mitchell Leaska.
