= The Widow and the Parrot =

- Short story by Virginia Woolf

Publication
- Published in: The Complete Shorter Fiction of Virginia Woolf
- Publication date: 1982

"The Widow and the Parrot" is a children's story by Virginia Woolf composed in 1922 or 1923 for a family newspaper. The story follows Mrs. Gage, an elderly widow, as she goes to collect an inheritance left to her by her miserly brother, Mr. Joseph Brand. In addition to a small cottage and £3,000, Mrs. Gage also inherits a parrot named James. The story concludes with the moral that "kindness to animals" is rewarded by happiness.

== Publication history ==
Woolf was asked to write a piece for the family newspaper, which was at the time edited by her nephews Quentin and Julian Bell. Quentin joked that he and Julian nearly rejected it for publication, describing it as an "improving story, based on the very worst Victorian examples." The story was not copyrighted until 1982 by Quentin Bell and Angelica Garnett, and it was later illustrated by Julian Bell (Quentin's son—not to be confused with Woolf's nephew) in 1988. In the Complete Shorter Fiction of Virginia Woolf (1985), edited by Susan Dick, "The Widow and the Parrot" appears with the subtitle "A True Story," though it does not appear in later versions.

== Synopsis ==
The narrative opens in Spilsby in Yorkshire, where the elderly Mrs. Gage lives with her dog Shag. When she receives news that her brother has died and left her an inheritance, she makes arrangements to travel to Rodmell to collect the inheritance. However, when she arrives, she discovers that the cottage is run down and that the money cannot be found. The only thing left is her brother's parrot, James. Mrs. Gage leaves Rodmell and begins to travel home on foot, but she is soon disoriented, nearly drowning when she tries to cross the river Ouse. She is saved by the light from a burning cottage, which she later discovers is her brother's former home. At the end of the story, it is revealed that James the parrot had tipped over an oil stove to burn down the home intentionally. Gage, who stays in Rodmell for the night, later hears James tapping on the window with his beak. He leads her to the now-razed cottage, where she learns her brother had buried gold sovereigns beneath the floor. Gage collects the money and lives with her dog and James the parrot in happiness with their new fortune.

== Themes ==
The text primarily considers the ethics of human/pet relationships, as Woolf concludes the story by suggesting that "kindness to animals" leads to happiness. Notably, Mrs. Gage is also disabled, as her lame leg makes it difficult for her to travel. Her companionship with James the parrot implies an interdependent connection, as both rely on each other in various ways; the story argues against moral frameworks which reduce human and nonhuman animals to their functional "use" within society.

Caroline Marie notes that "The Widow and the Parrot" presents a "moralizing dimension" not found in her other children's story, "Nurse Lugton's Curtain," and Kristin Czarnecki argues that "Nurse Lugton's Curtain" is comparably less "child friendly." Kristin Czarnecki in turn theorizes that Woolf's children's storytelling arguably freed her from certain highbrow "constraints" associated with literary culture in the early twentieth century.
