= Roger Fry: A Biography =

Book by Virginia Woolf

- Jacket portrait by Vanessa Bell
- Author: Virginia Woolf
- Language: English
- Publisher: Hogarth Press
- Publication date: 1940
- Publication place: United Kingdom
- Pages: 307
- OCLC: 1859726

Roger Fry: A Biography is a biography of Roger Fry written by Virginia Woolf. It was published in 1940, six years after his death. Woolf was asked by Fry's family to write his biography in 1934.
