= Epistulae ad Brutum =

Letters between Cicero and Brutus

Epistulae ad Brutum (Latin pronunciation: [ɛˈpɪs.tʊ.ɫae̯ ad ˈbruː.tũː]; Letters to Brutus) is a collection of letters between Roman politician and orator Marcus Tullius Cicero and fellow politician, and conspirator against Julius Caesar, Marcus Junius Brutus. The letters in this collection, when combined with Cicero's other letters, are considered some of the most reliable sources of information for the period leading up to the fall of the Roman Republic. Cicero became acquainted with Brutus through his close friend Titus Pomponius Atticus, an admirer of Brutus. Their personal relationship likely grew during their time together in opposition to Caesar during the civil war in 49 BCE, it being firmly established by the time Cicero returned to Rome in the autumn of 47.

Traditionally divided into two books, the collection features 26 letters written from March or April to July 43 BCE — a year after the assassination of Julius Caesar, and a year before the death of Brutus in 42. There are four or more incomplete letters, and all of them are between 4 and 146 lines long. The letters in this collection are the last known letters written by Cicero. The authenticity of the letters was for a long time cast into doubt, but is now generally recognized, with the exception of the first book's letters 16 and 17. These two letters resemble the style of suasoriae — exercises in rhetoric commonly used by students of the late Republic and Augustan eras. The second book of Cicero's letters to Brutus was first printed by Andreas Cratander of Basel in 1528 from a now lost manuscript obtained for him by Johannes Sichard from the Abbey of Lorsch. It is unclear who edited this collection of letters. The editor of the Epistulae ad Brutum is most likely the same as the editor of ad familiares. The first five letters of the manuscripts were missing, but they were added in the 1528 edition.

== Rediscovery ==
Epistulae ad Brutum was found by Petrarch in Verona in 1345, in a manuscript that also contained Epistulae ad Atticum and Epistulae ad Quintum Fratrem. The original manuscript and a copy made by Petrach are now both lost, but a copy made for Coluccio Salutati survived, and is now stored at the Laurentian Library in Florence.It is argued that this collection of letters was originally composed by nine book, but seven of the books had been lost.

== Authenticity ==
Epistulae ad Brutum is one of the lesser well-considered collections of letters along Cicero's works. There has been an on going discussion about its authenticity, which might be one of the reasons why this piece of literature is not the most prominent, even though it offers a great insight into the Roman political perspective and military positions before the Triumvirate is formed.

Letters 16 and 17 of Epistulae ad Brutum might be spurious. The authenticity of the first five letters was in doubt too, but eventually the whole collection, besides letters 16 and 17, was considered legitimate. Specifically, experts, like Whitton, Harvey and Tabacco to name some, argue that letters 16 and 17 are spurious, even though they are considered the most important letters of the collection. Letter 16 was sent from Brutus to Cicero, while letter 17 was sent to Brutus to Atticus. Both letters contain complaints from Brutus about the servile behaviors of Cicero toward the young Octavian.

Shackleton argues that a proof of letter's 17 inauthenticity is the fact that Cicero refers to Casca (one of Caesar's murderers) as 'sicarius', as Brutus complains when writing to Atticus. Canfora disagrees with Shackleton's reading of this passage, he points out Shackleton's, and the other experts who agree with his view, inability of empathizing with the current chaotic situation, characterized by unloyal relationships and rebellious behaviors. Moreover, Canfora argues that Cicero's use of the adjective 'sicarius' could be read as a proof of the letter's authenticity.

Cicero never mentions letter 16 in his following responses to Brutus correspondence, prompting some scholars to believe that this letter is inauthentic.
