= The Mark on the Wall =

Short story by Virginia Woolf

"The Mark on the Wall" is the first published short story by Virginia Woolf. It was published in 1917 as part of the first collection of short stories written by Virginia Woolf and her husband, Leonard Woolf, called Two Stories. It was later published in New York in 1921 as part of another collection entitled Monday or Tuesday.

== Summary ==
"The Mark on the Wall" is written in the first person, as a "stream of consciousness" monologue. The narrator notices a mark on the wall, and muses on the workings of the mind. Themes of religion, self-reflection, nature, and uncertainty are explored. The narrator reminisces about the development of thought patterns, beginning in childhood.

== Reception ==
Woolf's style in "The Mark on the Wall" has been frequently analyzed by literary writers; the story is used as an example of introspective writing.

The story acted as the foundation for the music theatre "The Mark on the Wall“ by Stepha Schweiger, which premiered in 2017 at opera festival Tête à Tête at the Royal Academy of Dramatic Arts.

== Publication ==
"The Mark on the Wall" has been included in a number of anthologies.

- Woolf, Virginia. "A Mark on the Wall." The Norton Anthology of English Literature.Vol. F. Ed. 8th ed. Ed.Stephen Jahan Ramazani; Greenblatt; M. H. Abrahms; Jon Stallworthy. New York: W. W. Norton, 2005.
- Woolf, Virginia. "A Mark on the Wall." Haunted House and other stories. Hogarth Press, London, 1944.
- Woolf, Virginia. (28 March 2014). Monday or Tuesday: Eight Stories. Start Classics. pp. 39–. ISBN 978-1-60977-494-3.
- Woolf, Virginia. "The Mark on the Wall." The Wordsworth Collection of Classic Short Stories. Wordsworth editions, 2007. pp. 1334-.
