= The Duchess and the Jeweller =

Short story by Virginia Woolf

- Short story by Virginia Woolf

Publication
- Publication type: Magazine
- Publisher: Harper's Bazaar
- Publication date: April 1938

"The Duchess and the Jeweller" (1938) is a short story by Virginia Woolf. Woolf, being an advocate of addressing the "stream of consciousness," shows the thoughts and actions of a greedy jeweller; Woolf makes a thematic point that corrupt people do corrupt actions for purely selfish motives (and often without regret). It is among Woolf's most controversial stories among critics because of the implicit characterisation of the jeweller as Jewish.

== Background ==
Virginia Woolf conceived of "The Duchess and the Jeweller" in 1932 alongside several other stories including "The Shooting Party," as part of a group of caricatures and satires of the upper classes. Scholars have suggested that an argument between Woolf's lover Vita Sackville-West and West's mother, Victoria Sackville-West, Baroness Sackville, in which Vita's mother accused her of selling her pearls and replacing them with counterfeits, inspired the pearls central to the plot.

Early versions of the story explicitly identified the character of the jeweller as Jewish. Woolf removed those references and changed his name during revisions at the request of agent Jacques Chambrun, who expressed concerns about "widespread racial prejudice in America". Many scholars, however, have argued that these undertones remain in the jeweller's characterisation, describing them as antisemitic stereotypes.

The story was first published in the American and British editions of Harper's Bazaar magazine in April 1938. It was subsequently published posthumously in 1944 in the collection A Haunted House and Other Short Stories.

== Plot summary ==
Oliver Bacon, a poor boy in the streets of London, has become the richest jeweller in England. As a young man, he sold stolen dogs to wealthy women and marketed cheap watches at a higher price. On a wall in his private room hangs a picture of his late mother. He frequently talks to her and reminisces, once chuckling at his past endeavours.

One day, Bacon enters his private shop room, barely acknowledging his underlings, and awaits the arrival of the Duchess. When she arrives, he has her wait. In his room, with yellow gloves, he opens barred windows to get some air. Later, Bacon opens six steel safes, each containing endless riches of jewels.

The Duchess and the jeweller are described as "... friends, yet enemies; he was master, she was mistress; each cheated the other, each needed the other, each feared the other ..." On this particular day, the Duchess comes to Bacon to sell ten pearls, as she has lost substantial money to gambling. Bacon is sceptical of the pearls' authenticity, but the Duchess manipulates him into buying them for £20,000. When the Duchess invites him to an event that includes royalty and her daughter Diana, Bacon is persuaded to write a cheque.

In the end, the pearls are found to be fakes, and Bacon looks at his mother's portrait, questioning his actions. However, what Bacon bought was not actually the pearls; it was Diana.
