= Monk's House =

Writer's house museum near Lewes, East Sussex, England

- Monk's House
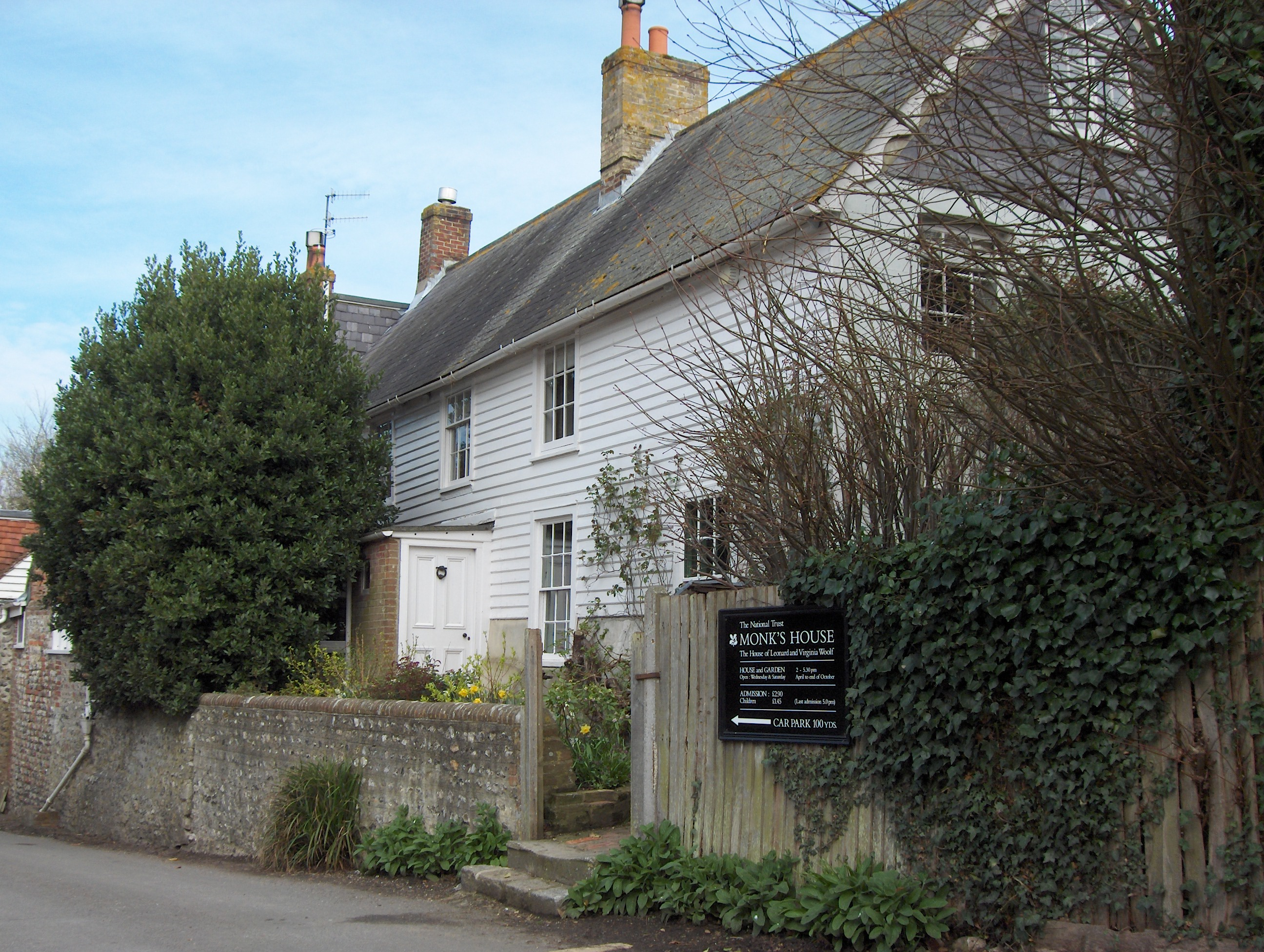

- Location within East Sussex Location within England
- 50.8387°N 0.0165°E
- Location: The Street, Rodmell, East Sussex, England

History
- Built: 17th-century

Site notes
- Owner: The National Trust

Listed Building – Grade II
- Official name: Monks House
- Designated: 27 September 1979
- Reference no.: 1273935

Monk's House is a 17th-century weatherboarded cottage in the village of Rodmell, three miles (4.8 km) south of Lewes, East Sussex, England. The writer Virginia Woolf and her husband, the political activist, journalist and editor Leonard Woolf, bought the house by auction at the White Hart Hotel, Lewes, on 1 July 1919 for 700 pounds, and received there many visitors connected to the Bloomsbury Group, including T. S. Eliot, E. M. Forster, Roger Fry and Lytton Strachey. The purchase is described in detail in her Diary, vol. 1, pp. 286–8.

Virginia's sister, the artist Vanessa Bell, lived at nearby Charleston Farmhouse in Firle from 1916, and though contrasting in style, both houses became important outposts of the Bloomsbury Group. The National Trust operates the building as a writer's house museum.

== Life at Monk's House ==
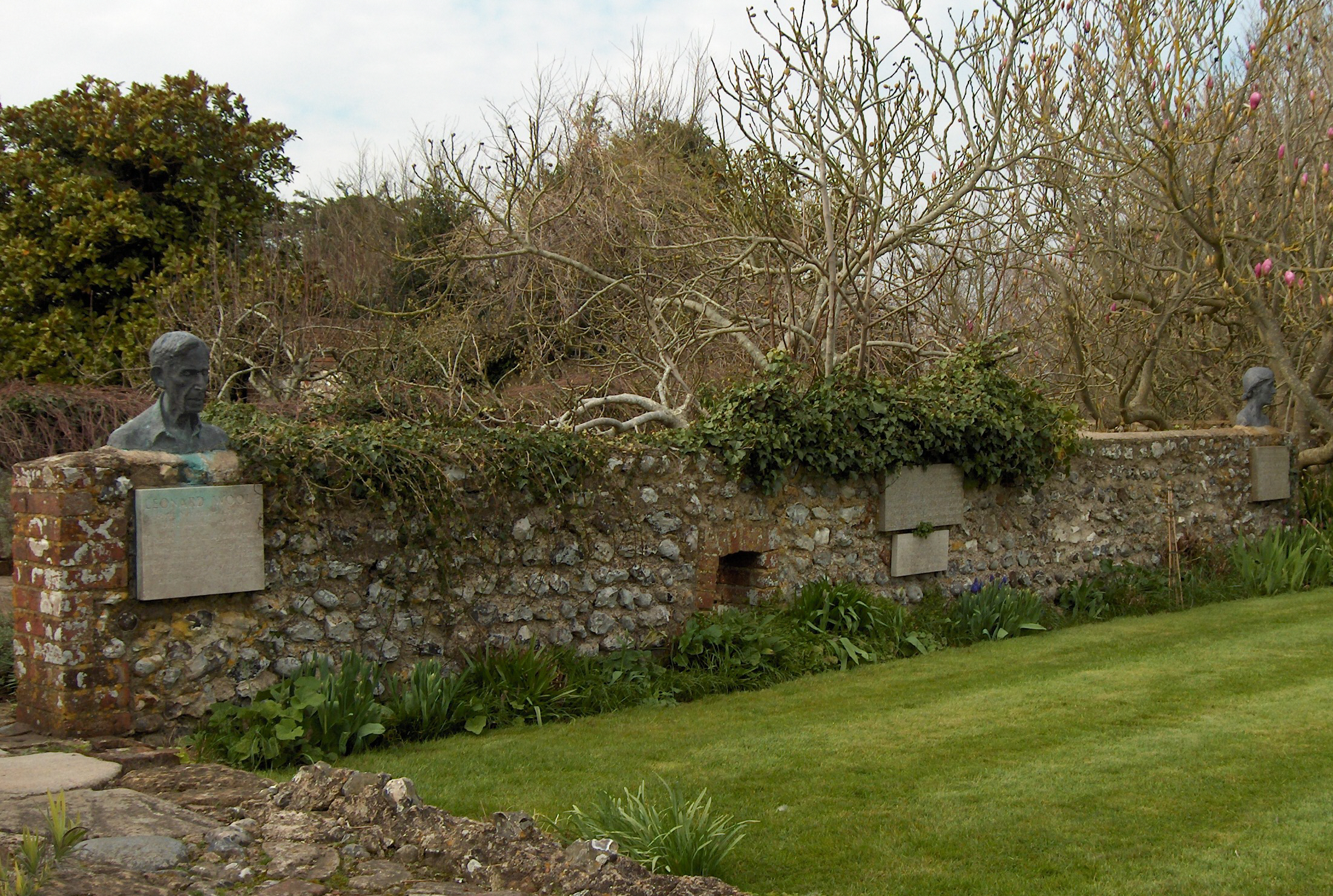
Busts of Virginia and Leonard Woolf in the garden of Monk's House

During the Woolfs' early years at Rodmell, Monk's House was of modest dimensions with three-quarters of an acre of garden including an orchard and a number of outbuildings. Conditions were primitive and over the years the Woolfs made many alterations and additions, including: improvements to the kitchen; the installation of a hot water range and bathroom with water closet; and a two-storey extension in 1929. In 1928 they bought an adjoining field to preserve the beautiful views from the garden towards Mount Caburn.

The Woolfs spent more and more time in Rodmell, eventually living there full-time from 1940 when their flat in Mecklenburgh Square, Bloomsbury, London, was damaged during an air raid. The solitude of village life allowed Virginia respite from the tumult of London, and it was in the small wooden lodge at the bottom of the garden that many of her novels took shape. Jacob's Room, published in 1922, Mrs Dalloway (1925), To The Lighthouse (1927), Orlando (1928), The Waves (1931), The Years (1937) and Between The Acts (1941), as well as other works, were also written there. Her final novel, Between the Acts, published posthumously in July 1941, is steeped in references to Rodmell and the traditions and values of its villagers.

Virginia documented her life at the house in photographs. Preserved in the Monk's House Albums, these include portraits and group pictures of many who visited the house.

In March 1941, Virginia died by suicide, placing a large rock in her pocket before drowning herself in the nearby River Ouse. Leonard continued to live at Monk's House until his death in 1969, and played an active role in village life. Both he and Virginia had been Labour Party members, and he became a manager of the village school in Rodmell in the 1930s. He was also treasurer and president of the Rodmell and District Horticultural Society.

== Monk's House today ==
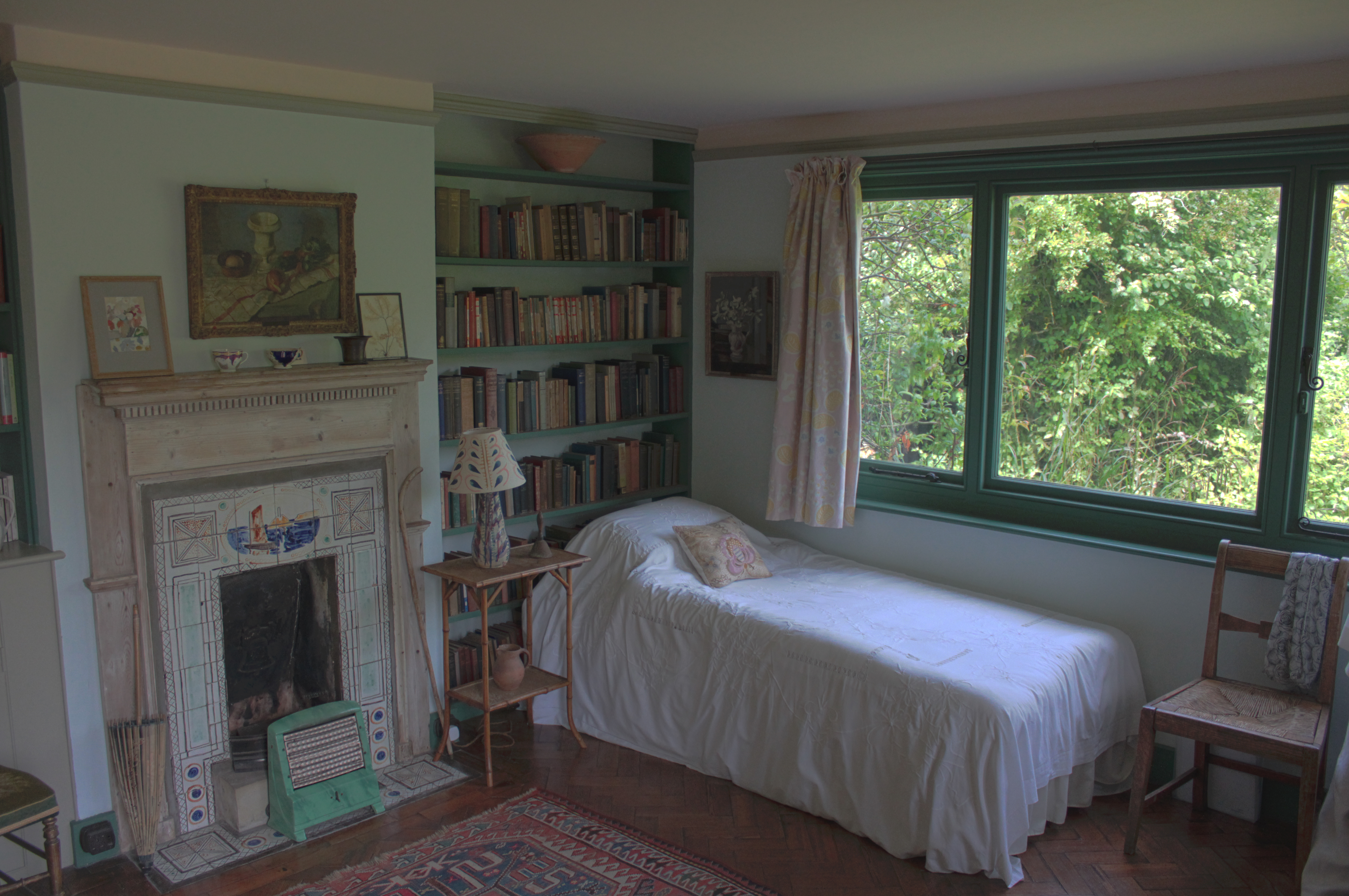
Virginia Woolf's bed at Monk's House

Upon Leonard's death the house was bequeathed to his close friend, the artist Trekkie Parsons, née Ritchie, who sold it to the University of Sussex in 1972. It was eventually turned over to the National Trust in 1980, and is open to the public. The ground floor, including sitting room, dining room, kitchen and Virginia's bedroom, is on display and Virginia's writing lodge can be found at the bottom of the garden with views across to Mount Caburn.
