= Kew Gardens (short story) =

1919 short story by Virginia Woolf

First edition (1919)

"Kew Gardens" is a short story by the English author Virginia Woolf.

It was first published privately in 1919, then more widely in 1921 in the collection Monday or Tuesday, and subsequently in the posthumous collection A Haunted House (1944). Originally accompanying illustrations by Vanessa Bell, its visual organisation has been described as analogous to a Post-Impressionist painting.

== Plot summary ==
Set in the eponymous botanic garden in London on a hot July day, the narrative gives brief glimpses of four groups of people as they pass by a flowerbed. The story begins with a description of the oval-shaped flower-bed. Woolf mixes the colours of the petals of the flowers, floating to the ground, with the seemingly random movements of the visitors, which she likens to the apparently irregular movements of butterflies.

The first group to pass by are a married couple, and the man, called Simon, recalls his visit fifteen years earlier when he begged a girl called Lily to marry him, but was rejected. Again Woolf centres the apparent randomness of the decision on the flitting of a dragonfly, which if it stops would indicate that Lily would say 'yes', but instead it kept whirling around and around in the air.

The woman who became Simon's wife, Eleanor, has a different memory of the gardens, a much earlier one, when she and other little girls sat near the lake with their easels, painting pictures of the water lilies. She had never seen red water lilies before. Someone kissed her on the back of the neck, the experience of which has remained with her ever since: the "mother of all kisses".

The couple with their children move out of vision and the narrative now focuses on a snail in the flowerbed. It appears to have a definite goal, and the narrator describes the vista before it and the journey it has to tackle. The focus pulls back again.

Two men stand at the flowerbed, a younger man called William and an older, somewhat unsteady man who is unnamed. The older man talks about heaven and makes oblique references to the war. He then appears to mistake a woman for someone in his thoughts, and prepares to run off to her, but is apprehended by William who distracts the older man by pointing out a flower. The old man leans in close to the flower as if he is listening to a voice inside it. The older man talks on, William's stoical patience grows deeper.

Next to approach are two elderly women the narrator describes as being lower middle class. They are fascinated by the old man's actions, but they cannot determine if he has mental health problems or is simply eccentric. The narrator recounts apparently isolated words and phrases: "he says, she says, I says", "Sugar, flour, kippers, greens". The stouter of the two women becomes detached from the conversation, and drowsily stares at the flowerbed. Finally, she suggests that they should find a seat and have their tea.

The narrative returns to the snail, still trying to reach its goal. After making a decision on its progress, it moves off as a young couple approaches the flowerbed. The young man remarks that on Friday admission to the gardens is sixpence, to which she asks if it is not worth sixpence. He asks what "it" means. She replies "anything." As they stand at the end of the flowerbed, they both press the young woman's parasol into the soil. His hand rests on top of hers. This action expresses their feelings for each other, as do their insignificant words. The narrator states that these are words with "short wings for their heavy body of meaning". Their feelings are evident to the two of them as well as others. The young man speaks to the young woman, Trissie, telling her they should have their tea now. She asks where they have tea in the garden. As she looks over a long grass path, she quickly forgets about the tea and wants to explore the gardens.

One couple after another moves through the gardens with the same aimlessness. Woolf's narrative now dissolves the snatches of conversation into flashes of colour, shape and movement, wordless voices of contentment, passion, and desire. Children's voices echo freshness and surprise. Finally, the focus pulls out beyond the gardens, contrasting the murmur of the city with the voices and colour of the gardens.

== Adaptations ==
- The final segment of the 2018 anthology film London Unplugged is adapted from Woolf's short story.
- In 2024, Matatabi Press published a modernized and simplified version of "Kew Gardens" along with Woolf's "A Society" in Kew Gardens & A Society: Level 600 Reader (L+) (CEFR B1). Written by Emily Aitken under the guidance of John McLean, this edition caters to modern readers with a CEFR B1 proficiency level.
