= The New Dress (short story) =

1927 short story by Virginia Woolf (written in 1924)

"The New Dress" is a short story by the English author Virginia Woolf.

It was written in 1924 whilst Woolf was writing Mrs. Dalloway (which was published the following year). It is possible that it was originally to have been a chapter in the novel; the two share some characters and events. It was not published until 1927 when it appeared in the May edition of The Forum. It appeared again in A Haunted House and Other Short Stories published in 1944, and in Mrs. Dalloway's Party published in 1973.

== Synopsis ==
The stream-of-consciousness narrative concerns Mabel Waring, deeply self-conscious and insecure as she attends a party hosted by Clarissa Dalloway. Mabel's new, though old-fashioned dress symbolizes her insecurity; she has gone to great care to have it made but on arrival at the party she sees it in a mirror and immediately announces to herself "No. It was not right".
