= Leonard Woolf =

British author and publisher (1880–1969)

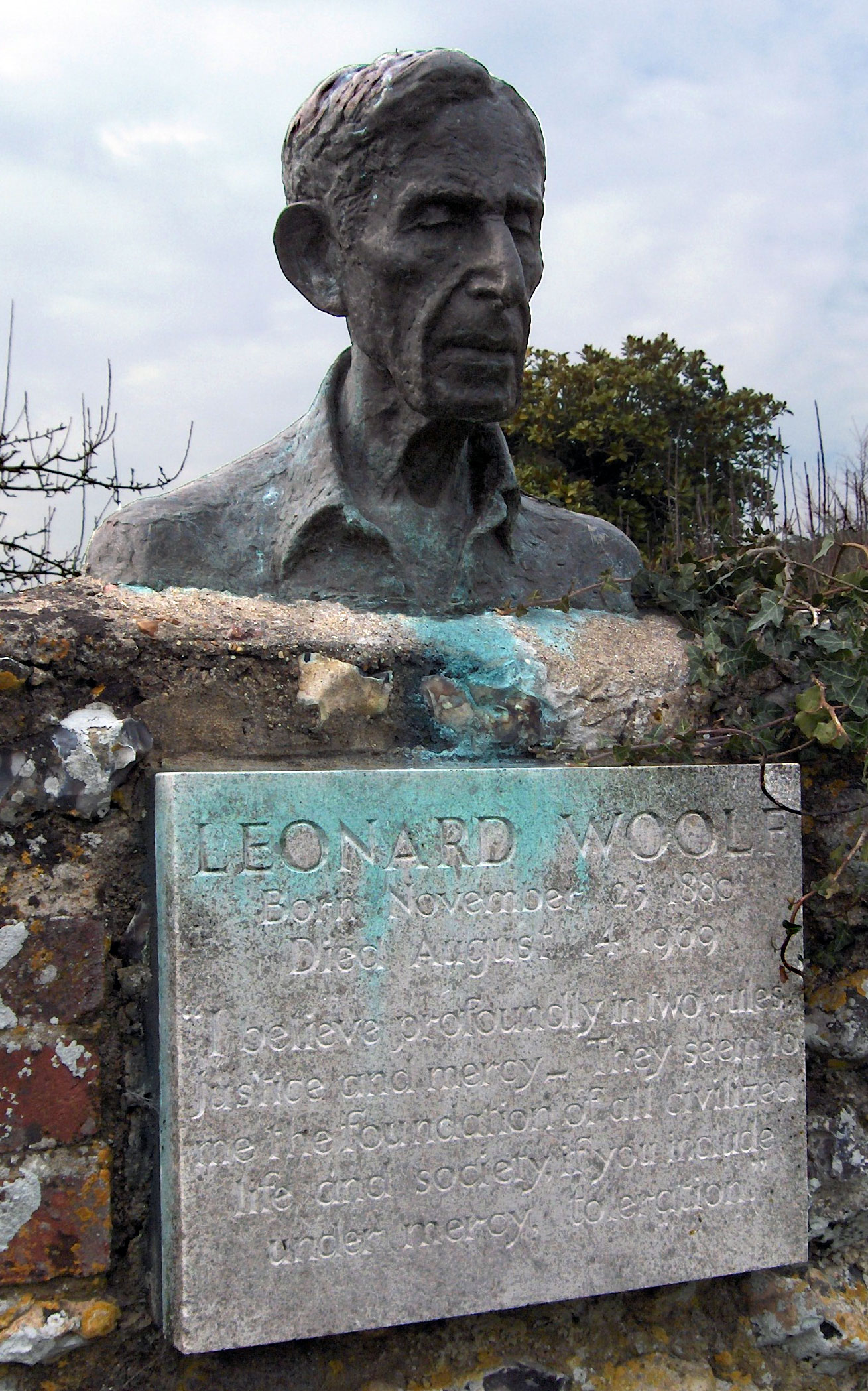
- Bust of Leonard Woolf at Monk's House
- Born: Leonard Sidney Woolf; 25 November 1880; London, England
- Died: 14 August 1969 (aged 88); Rodmell, England
- Education: Trinity College, Cambridge
- Occupations: Political theorist; author; publisher; civil servant
- Spouse: Virginia Woolf (m. 1912; died 1941)
- Partner: Trekkie Parsons
- Relatives: Bella Sidney Woolf (sister)

Leonard Sidney Woolf (25 November 1880 – 14 August 1969) was a British political theorist, author, publisher, and civil servant. He was married to author Virginia Woolf. As a member of the Labour Party and the Fabian Society, Woolf was an avid publisher of his own work and his wife's novels. A writer himself, Woolf created nineteen individual works and wrote six autobiographies. Leonard and Virginia did not have any children.

== Early life ==
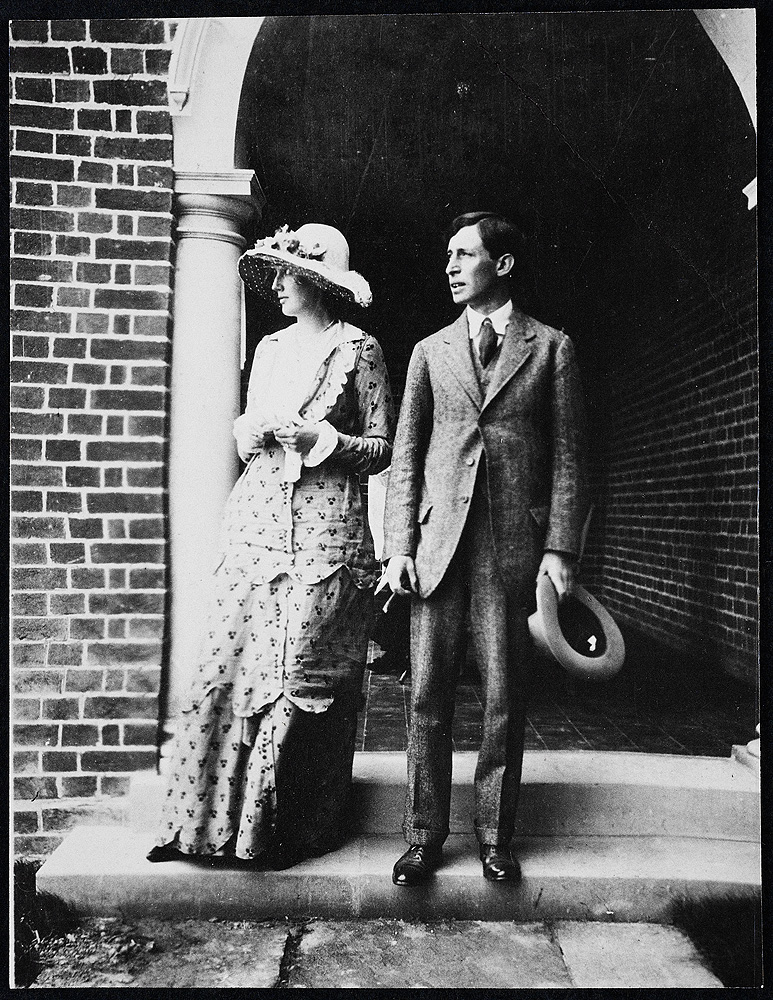
Leonard Woolf and his wife Virginia Woolf in 1912

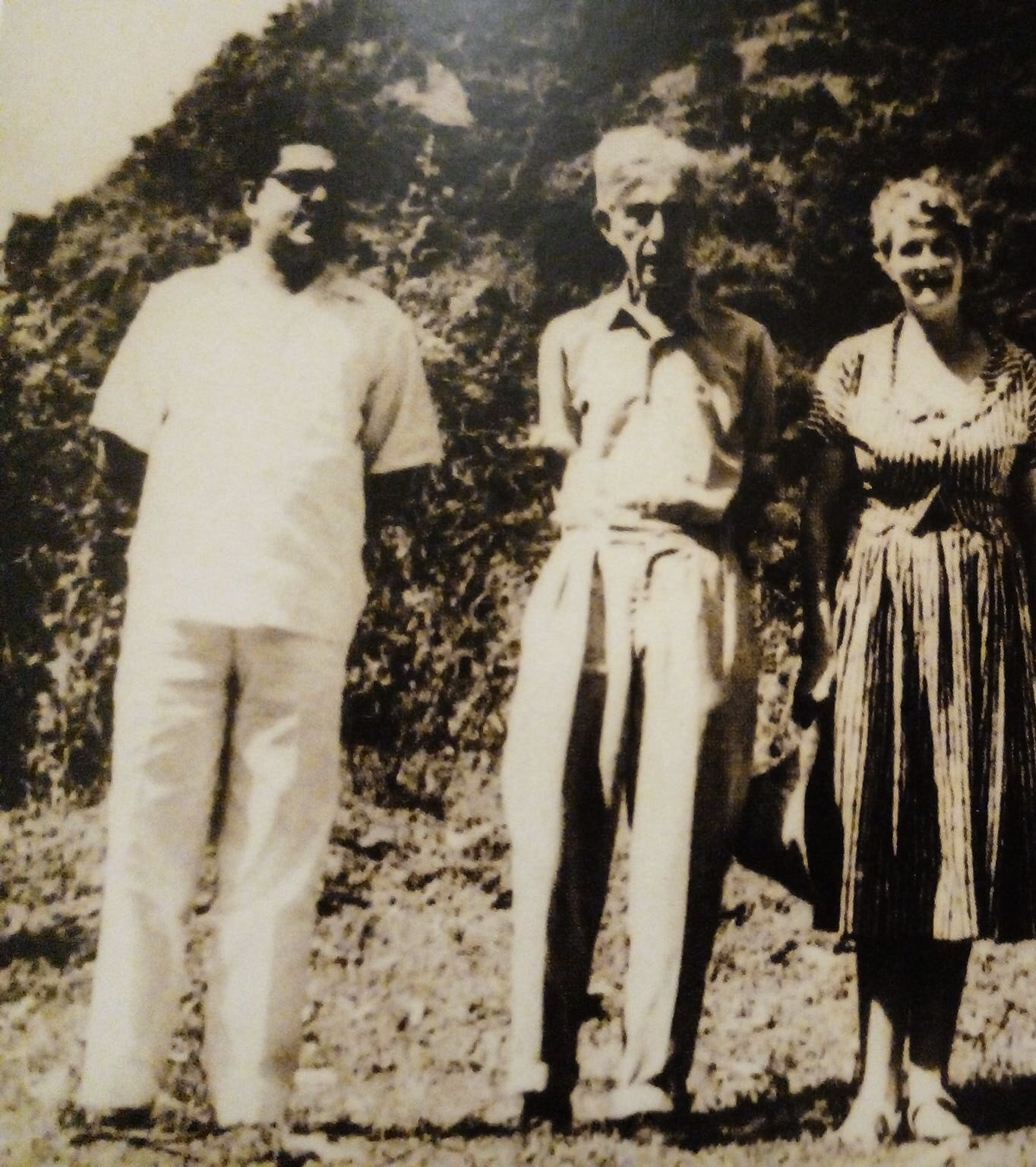
Government Agent of Anuradhapura District Nissanka Wijeyeratne with Leonard Woolf at Abhayagiri vihāra in 1960

Woolf was born in London in 1880 the third of ten children of Solomon Rees Sidney Woolf (known as Sidney Woolf), a barrister and Queen's Counsel, and Marie (née de Jongh). His family was Jewish. After his father died in 1892, Woolf was sent to board at Arlington House School near Brighton, Sussex. From 1894 to 1899, he attended St Paul's School, and in 1899 he won a classical scholarship to Trinity College, Cambridge, where he was elected to the Cambridge Apostles. Other contemporary members included Lytton Strachey, John Maynard Keynes, G. E. Moore, and E. M. Forster. Thoby Stephen (his future wife's brother) was friendly with the Apostles, though not a member himself. Woolf was awarded his BA in 1902 but stayed there for another year to study for the Civil Service examinations held then.

In October 1904, Woolf moved to Ceylon (now Sri Lanka) to become a cadet in the Ceylon Civil Service, in Jaffna and later Kandy, and by August 1908 was named an assistant government agent in the Southern Province, where he administered the District of Hambantota. Woolf returned to England in May 1911 for a year's leave. Instead, however, he resigned in early 1912 and that same year married Virginia Stephen.

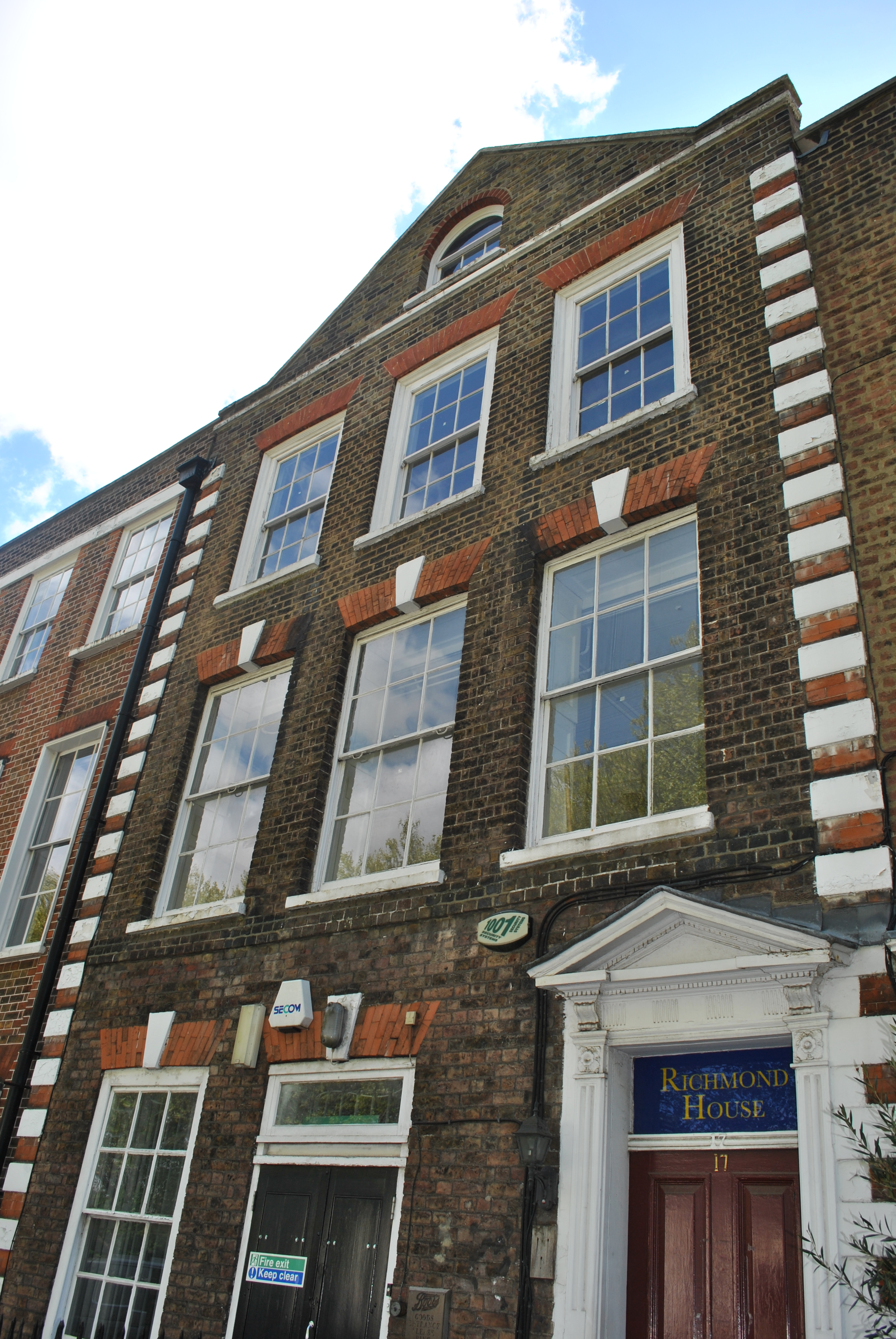
17 The Green, Richmond, 2017

Leonard and Virginia Woolf lived at 17 The Green, Richmond upon Thames, starting from October 1914. In early March 1915, the couple moved to nearby Hogarth House, Paradise Road.

In 1919, the Woolfs purchased the Round House in Pipe Passage, Lewes, East Sussex. The same year, they discovered Monk's House in nearby Rodmell, which both she and Leonard favoured because of its orchard and garden. She then bought Monk's House and sold the Round House.

Together, Leonard and Virginia Woolf became influential in the Bloomsbury Group, which also included various other former Apostles.

In December 1917, Woolf became one of the co-founders of the 1917 Club, which met in Gerrard Street, Soho.

== Writing ==
After marriage, Woolf turned to writing and published his first novel, The Village in the Jungle (1913), which is based on his years in Ceylon. A series of books followed at roughly bi-annual intervals.

On the introduction of conscription in 1916, during the First World War, Woolf was rejected for military service on medical grounds and turned to politics and sociology. He joined the Labour Party and the Fabian Society, and became a regular contributor to the New Statesman. In 1916, he wrote International Government, proposing an international agency to enforce world peace. He stood as the Labour candidate for the Combined English Universities in 1922.

As his wife's mental health worsened, Woolf devoted much of his time to caring for her (he himself suffered from depression). In 1917, the Woolfs bought a small hand-operated printing press and with it, they founded the Hogarth Press. Their first project was a pamphlet, hand-printed and bound by themselves. Within ten years the Press had become a full-scale publishing house, issuing Virginia's novels, Leonard's tracts and, among other works, the first edition of T. S. Eliot's The Waste Land. Woolf continued as the main director of the Press until his death. His wife suffered from severe bouts of mental illness throughout her life, until her suicide by drowning in 1941. Later, Leonard fell in love with a married artist, Trekkie Parsons.

In 1919, Woolf became editor of the International Review. He also edited the international section of the Contemporary Review from 1920 to 1922. He was literary editor of The Nation and Athenaeum (generally referred to simply as The Nation) from 1923 to 1930, and joint founder and editor of The Political Quarterly from 1931 to 1959, and for a time he served as secretary of the Labour Party's advisory committees on international and colonial questions.

General Election 1922: Combined English Universities (2 seats)
Party	Candidate	FPv%	Count				
Party	Candidate	FPv%	1	2	3	4	5
Unionist	Martin Conway	32.8	968	982	1,093		
National Liberal	H. A. L. Fisher	27.7	819	821	849	883	1,009
Independent	John Strong	19.4	571	575	595	611	813
Labour	Leonard Woolf	12.2	361	361	365	366	eliminated
Ind. Unionist	Wilfred Faraday	4.8	141	206	eliminated		
Ind. Unionist	Sidney C. Lawrence	3.1	90	eliminated			
Electorate: 3,967 Valid: 2,946 Quota: 983 Turnout: 74.3

In the Second World War he served in the Home Guard which he joined despite Virginia's staunchly pacifist disapproval. In 1960, Woolf revisited Ceylon and was surprised at the warmth of the welcome he received, and even the fact that he was still remembered. Woolf accepted an honorary doctorate from the then-new University of Sussex in 1964 and in 1965 he was elected a Fellow of the Royal Society of Literature. He declined the offer of Companion of Honour (CH) in the Queen's Birthday Honours list in 1966.

== Family ==
Among his nine siblings, Bella Woolf was also an author. His brother Cecil Nathan Sidney Woolf was the author of Poems (published 1918); Cecil was killed in World War I in 1917. His dissertation Bartolus of Sassoferrato, his Position in the History of Medieval Political Thought was expanded to a book published by Cambridge University Press in 1913 in collaboration with his brother Philip. Philip and Cecil also translated Stendhal's On Love (Duckworth, 1915).

== Death ==
Woolf died on 14 August 1969 from a stroke. He was cremated and his ashes were buried alongside his wife's beneath an elm tree in his beloved garden at Monk's House, Rodmell, Sussex. The tree subsequently blew down and Woolf's remains have since been marked by a bronze bust.

His papers are held by the University of Sussex at the Falmer campus.

== Works ==
- The Village in the Jungle – 1913
- The Wise Virgins – 1914 (Republished in 2003 by Persephone Books)
- International Government – 1916
- The Future of Constantinople – 1917
- The Framework of a Lasting Peace - 1917
- Cooperation and the Future of Industry – 1918
- Economic Imperialism – 1920
- Empire and Commerce in Africa – 1920
- Socialism and Co-operation – 1921
- International co-operative trade – 1922
- Fear and Politics – 1925
- Essays on Literature, History, Politics – 1927
- Hunting the Highbrow – 1927
- Imperialism and Civilization – 1928
- After the Deluge (Principia Politica), 3 vols. – 1931, 1939, 1953
- Quack! Quack! – 1935
- Barbarians at the Gate – 1939
- The War for Peace – 1940
- A Calendar of Consolation – selected by Leonard Woolf, 1967

=== Autobiographical works ===
- Woolf, Leonard (1960). Sowing: An Autobiography of the Years 1880–1904. London: Hogarth Press. OCLC 185524636. Published in America as Woolf, Leonard (1960). Sowing: An Autobiography of the Years 1880–1904 (1st American ed.). New York: Harcourt, Brace. ISBN 978-0-15-683945-7. OCLC 1346957. Also OCLC 1339821.
- Woolf, Leonard (1961). Growing: An Autobiography of the Years 1904–1911 (1st American ed.). New York: Harcourt, Brace & World. OCLC 494500. Also OCLC 21246847 (1977), OCLC 67527334 (1967), Eland (2015).
- Woolf, Leonard (1963). Diaries in Ceylon, 1908–1911, and Stories from the East: Records of a Colonial Administrator. London: Hogarth Press. OCLC 30240642. Also OCLC 4194108
- Woolf, Leonard (1975) [1964]. Beginning Again: An Autobiography of the Years 1911 to 1918. Harcourt Brace Jovanovich. ISBN 978-0-15-611680-0.
- Woolf, Leonard (1967). Downhill All the Way: An Autobiography of the Years 1919–1939 (1st American ed.). New York: Harcourt, Brace & World. OCLC 1065888.
- Woolf, Leonard (1969). The Journey Not the Arrival Matters: An Autobiography of the Years 1939–1969. London: Hogarth Press. ISBN 978-0-7012-0326-9. OCLC 186031338. Published in America as Woolf, Leonard (1969). The Journey Not the Arrival Matters: An Autobiography of the Years 1939–1969 (1st American ed.). New York: Harcourt, Brace & World. OCLC 58615.

== Portrayals ==
- In 1982, a film version in Sinhala of Woolf's novel, Village in the Jungle, called Bæddegama was released. It featured Arthur C. Clarke in the role of Woolf.
- A film version of Michael Cunningham's 1998 Pulitzer Prize winning novel, The Hours, was released in 2002, starring Nicole Kidman as Virginia Woolf. The part of Leonard Woolf was played by Stephen Dillane.
- Al Weaver and Guy Henry played the younger and older Leonard Woolf in the 2015 BBC Two miniseries Life in Squares.
- Peter Ferdinando portrayed Leonard Woolf in the 2018 film Vita & Virginia.

== See also ==
- Virginia Woolf
- Trekkie Parsons
