= 1836 in literature =

Revizor - Nikolai Gogol (1836)

This article contains information about the literary events and publications of 1836.

== Events ==
- March 31 (dated April) – The first monthly part of The Pickwick Papers by Charles Dickens is issued in London. On April 20, the original illustrator, Robert Seymour, committed suicide. Seymour provided the illustrations for the first two instalments before his suicide. Robert William Buss illustrated the third instalment. Buss set aside his other work immediately. He prepared a dozen or so preliminary sketches for the novel, then in its second of twenty instalments. His drawings were regarded as adequate, but the process of etching on a steel plate was unfamiliar to him, so he hired an expert etcher. Buss realised that the "free touch of an original work was entirely wanting", and that the printed images lifted from his plates seemed lifeless and uninspired. He concluded, however, "Time was up"; the unsatisfactory illustrations for Part Three had to be issued. The publishers dismissed him summarily: this disturbed Buss for the rest of his life. The commission went instead to Hablot Knight Browne, but Buss never held his dismissal against Dickens. Instead, Buss remained his lifelong admirer and went on to produce several paintings celebrating the author's work, including the unfinished Dickens' Dream. The remaining instalments were illustrated by Hablot Knight Browne, who illustrated most of Dickens's subsequent novels. Browne's first two etched plates for Pickwick were signed "Nemo", but the third was signed "Phiz", a pseudonym which he retained in his subsequent work. When asked to explain why he chose this name, Browne answered that the change from "Nemo" to "Phiz" was made to harmonize better with Dickens's "Boz". The novel's instalments were first published in book form in 1837.
- April 2 – Dickens marries Catherine Hogarth at St Luke's Church, Chelsea (London). They honeymoon at Chalk, Kent.Catherine's sister, Mary Hogarth, entered Dickens's Doughty Street household to offer support to her newly married sister and brother-in-law. It was usual for an unwed sister of a wife to live with and help a newly married couple. Dickens became very attached to Mary, with historians debating the nature of the relationship. Mary died in Dickens' arms after a brief illness in 1837. She became a character in many of his books, and her death is fictionalised as the death of Little Nell.
- April 19 – Nikolai Gogol's satire The Government Inspector («Ревизор») is premièred at the Alexandrinsky Theatre in Saint Petersburg before the Emperor Nicholas I of Russia and first published there. The publication of the play led to a great outcry in the reactionary press. It took the personal intervention of Nicholas I to have the play staged, with Mikhail Shchepkin taking the role of the Mayor. Nicholas I was personally present at the play's premiere at the Alexandrinsky Theatre in Saint Petersburg on April 19, 1836, concluding that "there is nothing sinister in the comedy, as it is only a cheerful mockery of bad provincial officials." Gogol's works often satirised political corruption in the contemporary Russian Empire, but Gogol also enjoyed the patronage of Nicholas I, who personally liked his works.
- June – Georg Büchner begins work on his play Woyzeck; it remains unfinished when he dies the following year in Zürich.
- August 20 – The legal deposit privilege in the U.K. is removed from the libraries of Sion College in London, the four universities in Scotland and King's Inns in Dublin and replaced by a government grant for the purchase of books.
- September – The Flinders Island Chronicle is founded in Australia, the first newspaper produced by indigenous Australians.
- October 23 – Honoré de Balzac's novel La Vieille Fille (The Old Maid) begins a 12-day serialization in the newly established Paris newspaper La Presse, as the first novel serialized in the French press.
- November 6 – The funeral of Czech romantic poet Karel Hynek Mácha takes place on what should have been the day of his wedding to Eleonora Šomková, about a month after the birth of their child. Mácha had overexerted himself in helping put out a fire and died just before his 26th birthday of pneumonia in Litoměřice.
- December – Charles Dickens first meets, in London, a lifelong friend, the biographer and critic John Forster.
- unknown dates
  - The Russian literary, social and political quarterly Sovremennik («Современник», The Contemporary), edited by Alexander Pushkin, begins publication in Saint Petersburg. It publishes Fyodor Tyutchev's poetry, and the fourth issue contains Pushkin's historical novel The Captain's Daughter («Капитанская дочка», Kapitanskaya dochka).
  - The Hon. Grantley Berkeley M.P. assaults publisher James Fraser in his office over a review published in Fraser's Magazine of Berkeley's Berkeley Castle: an historical romance (for which Berkeley is convicted). Berkeley subsequently fights a pistol duel with the review's (anonymous) author William Maginn in London without hurt to either party.
  - The first printed literature in Assyrian Neo-Aramaic is produced by Justin Perkins, an American Presbyterian missionary in Persia.
  - The dissertation of the German writer Georg Büchner on the common barbel (fish), Barbus barbus, "Mémoire sur le Système Nerveux du Barbeaux (Cyprinus barbus L.)", appears in Paris and Strasbourg. After receiving his doctorate, he is appointed in October by the University of Zurich as a lecturer in anatomy.

== New books ==
=== Fiction ===
- Hans Christian Andersen – O. T.
- Awful Disclosures of Maria Monk, or, The Hidden Secrets of a Nun's Life in a Convent Exposed (January)
- Honoré de Balzac
  - Le Lys dans la vallée (The Lily of the Valley)
  - Facino Cane
- Alfred de Musset – La Confession d'un enfant du siècle (The Confession of a Child of the Century)
- Charles Dickens – The Pickwick Papers
- Alexandre Dumas – The Countess of Salisbury
- Thomas Gaspey – The Self-Condemned
- Théophile Gautier – "La Morte amoureuse" (short story)
- Louis Geoffroy – Histoire de la Monarchie universelle: Napoléon et la conquête du monde (1812–1832)
- William Nugent Glascock – Tales of a Tar, with characteristic Anecdotes
- Nikolai Gogol
  - "The Carriage" (short story)
  - "The Nose" («Нос», short story)
- Catherine Gore – Mrs. Armytage
- Thomas Colley Grattan – Agnes de Mansfeldt
- Thomas Chandler Haliburton – The Clockmaker
- Washington Irving – Astoria
- Alexander Pushkin – The Captain's Daughter
- X. B. Saintine – Picciola
- Nathaniel Beverley Tucker
  - George Balcombe
  - The Partisan Leader

=== Children ===
- Letitia Elizabeth Landon – Traits and Trials of Early Life
- William Holmes McGuffey (ed.) – first McGuffey Readers
- Frederick Marryat
  - Japhet, in Search of a Father
  - Mr Midshipman Easy
  - The Pirate
  - The Three Cutters
- Agnes Strickland – Tales and Stories From History

=== Drama ===
- Georg Büchner – Leonce and Lena (Leonce und Lena)
- Alexandre Dumas – Kean
- Nikolai Gogol
  - Leaving the Theater (After the Staging of a New Comedy) («Театральный разъезд после представления новой комедии»)
  - The Government Inspector
- Henrik Hertz – The Savings Bank (Sparekassen)
- James Sheridan Knowles – The Daughter
- George William Lovell – The Provost of Bruges

=== Poetry ===
- Robert Browning – "Porphyria's Lover"
- Girolamo de Rada – Këngët e Milosaos
- Oliver Wendell Holmes – Poems
- Andreas Munch – Ephemerer

=== Non-fiction ===
- Ralph Waldo Emerson – Nature
- William Nugent Glascock – Naval Service, or Officers' Manual
- Washington Irving – Astoria
- Søren Kierkegaard – On the Polemic of Fædrelandet
- Claude François Lallemand – Des Pertes séminales involuntaires (On involuntary seminal losses, 3 vols, to 1842)
- John Murray III – A Hand-book for Travellers on the Continent; being a guide through Holland, Belgium, Prussia and northern Germany, and along the Rhine from Holland to Switzerland
- A. W. N. Pugin – Contrasts
- G. W. M. Reynolds – Grace Darling
- Arthur Schopenhauer – Über den Willen in der Natur (On the Will in Nature)
- Catharine Parr Traill – The Backwoods of Canada

== Births ==
- January 27 – Leopold von Sacher-Masoch, Austrian writer (died 1895)
- February 17 – Gustavo Adolfo Bécquer, Spanish Andalusian poet and short-story writer (died 1870)
- March 4 – Matilda Betham-Edwards, English novelist, poet and travel writer (died 1919)
- April 25 – Emily Sarah Holt, English novelist (died 1893)
- May 17 – Virginie Loveling, Belgian author and poet (died 1923)
- June 16 – Jane Marsh Parker, American novelist and religious writer (died 1913)
- July 16 – Marietta Holley, American humorist (died 1926)
- August 25 – Bret Harte, American author (died 1902)
- August 27 – Lizzie P. Evans-Hansell, American novelist and short-story writer (died 1922)
- September 11 – Fitz Hugh Ludlow, American author (died 1870)
- September 22 – Emeline S. Burlingame, American editor and reformer (died 1923)
- October 4 – Juliette Adam, French author (died 1936)
- November 4 – Annie Ryder Gracey, American writer and missionary (died 1908)
- November 11 – Thomas Bailey Aldrich, American poet and novelist (died 1870)
- November 18 – W. S. Gilbert, English humorist, playwright and librettist (died 1911)
- November 20 – Lucy Morris Chaffee Alden, American author, educator and hymnwriter (died 1912)
- December 7 – Nellie Blessing Eyster, American journalist, writer, and reformer (died 1922)

== Deaths ==
- February 5 – Dorothy Kilner, English children's writer (born 1755)
- March 5 – William Taylor, English man of letters (born 1765)
- March 9 – Antoine Destutt de Tracy, French philosopher (born 1754)
- April 7 – William Godwin, English political writer and novelist (born 1756)
- June 7 – Nathan Drake, English essayist and physician (born 1766)
- September 5 – Ferdinand Raimund, Austrian playwright (born 1790)
- September 6 – Louisa Gurney Hoare, English diarist and writer on education (born 1784)
- September 12 – Christian Dietrich Grabbe, German playwright (born 1801)
- November 5 – Karel Hynek Mácha, Czech poet (born 1810)
- December 1 – Jozef Ignác Bajza, Slovak satirist (born 1755)
- In fiction – Don Vincente, Spanish ex-monk, bibliomaniac, book-thief and murderer (executed)
