= Gobseck =

1830 novella by Honoré de Balzac

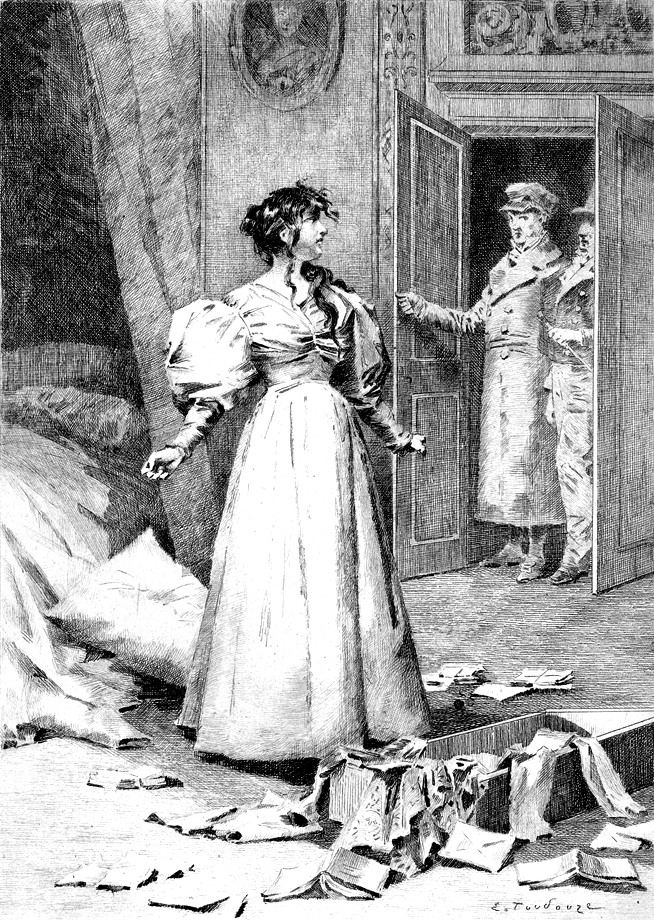
- 1897 illustration from Gobseck (Mme de Restaud, Gobseck and Derville) by Édouard Toudouze
- Author: Honoré de Balzac
- Language: French
- Series: La Comédie humaine
- Publication date: 1830
- Publication place: France
- Preceded by: Béatrix
- Followed by: La Femme de trente ans

Gobseck is an 1830 novella by French author Honoré de Balzac (1799-1850) which is in the Scènes de la vie privée section of his novel sequence La Comédie humaine. Gobseck first appeared in outline form in La Mode in March 1830 under the title l'Usurier (The Usurer), and then in August 1830 in the periodical Le Voleur. The actual novella appeared in a volume published by Mame-Delaunay under the title Les Dangers de l'inconduite. This novella would appear in 1835 under the title of Papa Gobseck in a volume published by Madame Charles-Béchet. The definitive title of Gobseck originated in 1842 in the Furne edition of La Comédie humaine.

== Plot ==
The plot of Gobseck, set during the French Restoration period of 1815 to 1830, is framed within a conversation between lawyer Maître Derville and the Vicomtesse de Grandlieu. Derville tells a story which focuses on Anastasie de Restaud, née Goriot. Anastasie, the daughter of a rich bourgeois who has married into the aristocracy, is bored by her marriage, which is loveless and passionless.

Anastasie de Restaud has an affair with Maxime de Trailles, and spends her fortune on de Trailles. She turns to the usurer Jean-Esther van Gobseck for financial assistance. Maître Derville acts as Gobseck’s lawyer, while Derville's future wife is also one of Gobseck's debtors.

Anastasie's husband finds out about her debts, so he signs a convoluted contract with Gobseck which is supposed to benefit his and Anastasie's children. However, Anastasie destroys that contract during her irrational schemings. Subsequently, both Anastasie's marriage is destroyed and her family fortune lost.

Eventually, the elderly Gobseck gains an even larger fortune through factoring. Shortly after his death, Derville discovers many treasures in Gobseck's home, including loads of spoiled food which Gobseck had intended to sell.

"'Daddy Gobseck,' I began, 'is intimately convinced of the truth of the principle which he takes for a rule of life. In his opinion, money is a commodity which you may sell cheap or dear, according to circumstances, with a clear conscience. A capitalist, by charging a high rate of interest, becomes in his eyes a secured partner by anticipation. Apart from the peculiar philosophical views of human nature and financial principles, which enable him to behave like a usurer, I am fully persuaded that, out of his business, he is the most loyal and upright soul in Paris. There are two men in him; he is petty and great — a miser and a philosopher…'"

— Honoré de Balzac, Gobseck

== Film versions ==
- Gobseck, Soviet film by Konstantin Eggert
- Gobseck, Soviet remake of the 1936 film by Alexandre Orlov.
- Gobseck, a 1985 Czechoslovak TV play
