= Francis Bacon Piano Company =

Piano Manufacturer

The Francis Bacon Piano Company
- Formerly: Dubois & Stodart; Bacon & Raven; Bacon & Karr
- Founded: 1789 in New York City
- Founders: John Jacob Astor; Robert Stodart; William Dubois
- Defunct: 1934
- Fate: Absorbed into Kohler & Campbell
- Products: Pianos

The Francis Bacon Piano Company was established in New York in 1789 by John Jacob Astor, Robert Stodart, and William Dubois as Dubois & Stodart. They produced player pianos, electric expression players, reproducing pianos, and grand pianos. Some were licensed under the Welte-Mignon patents. The pianos received many awards, including from the Franklin Institute State of Pennsylvania, Merchants Institute Fair of Washington, and the World's Columbian Exposition in Chicago. They were brought to the 1876 World's Fair in Philadelphia and at Chicago in 1908. The company was eventually bought by Kohler & Campbell, which manufactured the brand until 1934.
