= Le Voleur (magazine) =

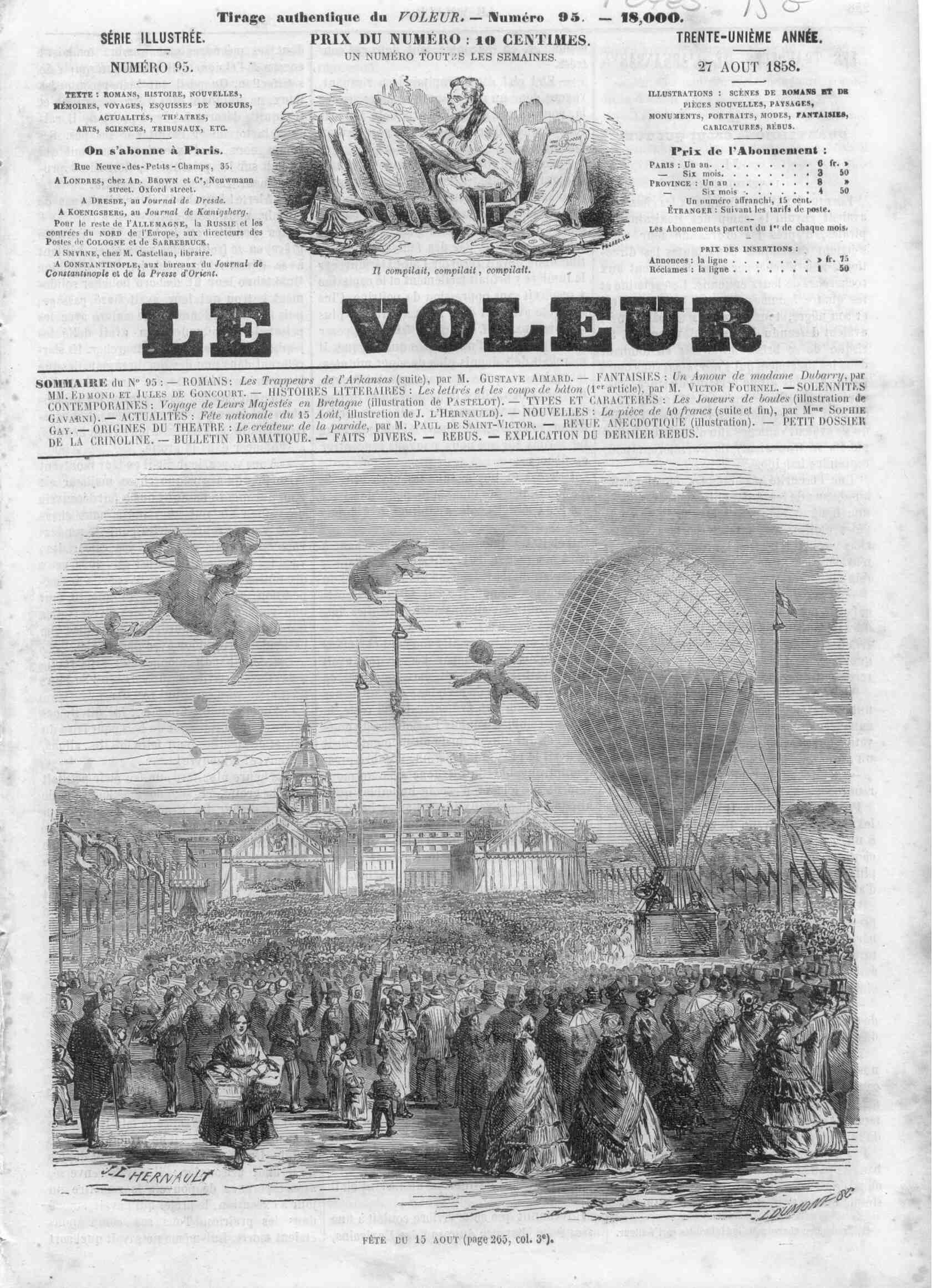
Cover of the 27 August 1858 issue

Le Voleur was an illustrated literary magazine published weekly in Paris from 1828 until 1907. It was established by Charles Lautour-Mézeray and Émile de Girardin. During its existence, it had a variety of subtitles including Journal littéraire de Paris and Gazette des journaux français et étrangers. In the last decades of its publication it went by the title Le Voleur illustré. The journal published literary criticism, satire, interviews, extracts from recently published or soon-to-be published fiction, and reprints of (often sensationalist) articles from other magazines and newspapers.

The title of Le Voleur (French for "The Thief") reflected its practice of lifting articles and illustrations from other publications, often without credit to the previous author or publication. Plagiarism was pervasive in French journals in the 19th century. However, Le Voleur was quite explicit about it. The editorial of its first issue (5 April 1828) stated that each month 136 newspapers and magazines were published in Paris and Le Voleur would "pillage from whatever it could find." An example of this is the tale of Don Vincente, an alleged Spanish monk, serial killer and bibliomaniac. The story was first published in France as a factual court case in the Gazette des Tribunaux on 23 October 1836. A week later Le Voleur published an abridged version. The articles are thought to have inspired the fourteen-year-old Flaubert to write his first published short-story, "Bibliomanie" which appeared in the Rouen literary magazine Le Colibri in 1837.

Amongst the literary works by Honoré de Balzac which appeared in Le Voleur were fragments from Gobseck under the title L'Usurier (August 1830) and La Peau de chagrin under the title Une débauche (June 1831) and the complete text of his short story Un drame au bord de la mer (November 1834). From 1829 to 1831 Balzac also worked as a journalist for the magazine as well as for two other publications owned by Lautour-Mézeray and Girardin–La Mode and La Silhouette. Other journalists who wrote for Le Voleur included Frédéric Soulié and Samuel-Henri Berthoud.
