= Langdon Estate Gatehouse =

- U.S. National Register of Historic Places
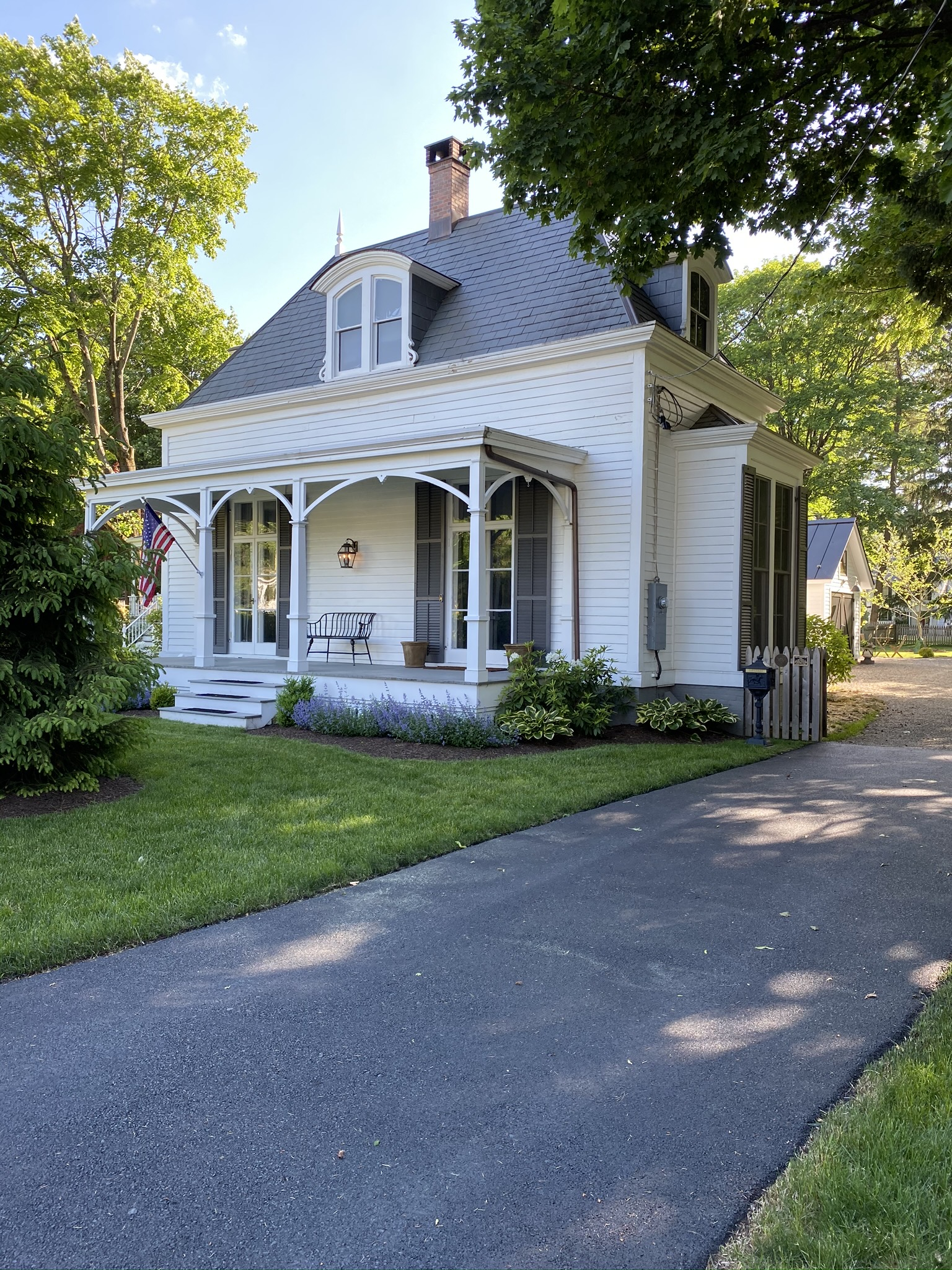
- The Gatehouse

- Location within New York Location within the United States
- Location: 4419 Albany Post Road Hyde Park, New York
- Coordinates: 41.793123°N 73.937605°W
- Built: 1876
- Architectural style: French Renaissance
- NRHP reference No.: 93000865
- Added to NRHP: July 2021

The Langdon Estate Gatehouse is a historic home located in Hyde Park, New York. It was built in 1876 and is a 1 1/2-story, two-bay dwelling in the Renaissance Revival style. It has a rectangular main block with a kitchen wing covered by steeply pitched, slate-covered, hipped roofs with round-head dormers. The house's elegant ceiling molding, oak hardwood floors, high ceilings and wooden mantles reflect the wealth of the estate.

The home was built as the gatehouse for the Langdon Estate which was the home of Walter Langdon and Dorothea Astor Langdon, the daughter of wealthy New York City businessman John Jacob Astor. Walter Langdon built the gatehouse as a wedding gift for Emily Astor Kane, his favorite niece.

Emily Astor Kane married Augustus Jay, the great-grandson of the nation's first Chief Justice of the United States Supreme Court, John Jay, and the newlyweds moved into the home. Notably, Augustus Jay served as Secretary of the American embassy in Paris from 1885 to 1893.

When Walter Langdon, Jr. died, the entire Langdon Estate was purchased by Frederick W. Vanderbilt. The New York Times reported the estate acquisition in an article on August 29, 1895, in which the reporter described the estate as "the finest place on the Hudson between New York and Albany."

As part of Vanderbilt's extensive redesign of the grounds, he commissioned the construction of a new stone gatehouse. Vanderbilt ordered the Langdon Estate Gatehouse to be moved 50 yards south to the edge of the estate grounds where it now sits at 4419 Albany Post Road.

The Gatehouse and property around the Vanderbilt Estate was eventually sold to private individuals and the remaining 211 acres of the Vanderbilt Estate were donated by the Vanderbilt family to the U.S. government and is now preserved by the National Park Service as the Vanderbilt Mansion National Historic Site.

The Gatehouse was added to the National Register of Historic Places in 1993.

The Gatehouse was historically restored in late 2015 and early 2016. The project was overseen by Handcrafted Builders of Rhinebeck. They applied a "built-by-hand" approach to the project - restoring even the smallest of details inside and outside the home.

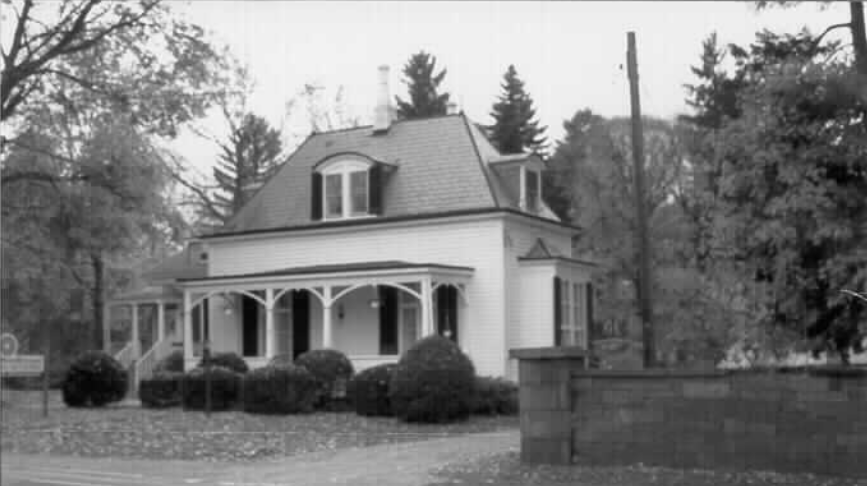
Langdon Estate Gatehouse circa 1991

== Gallery ==
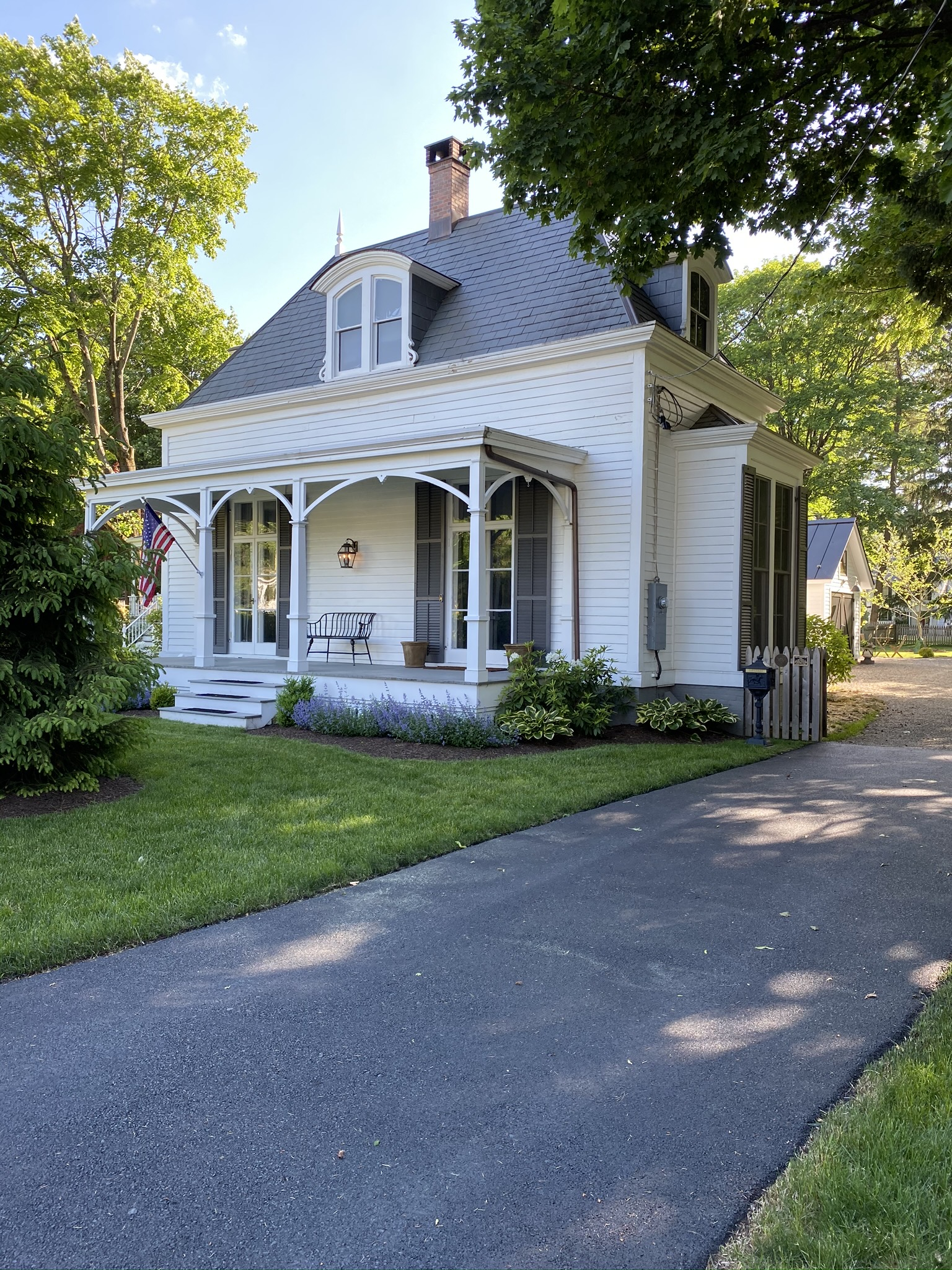

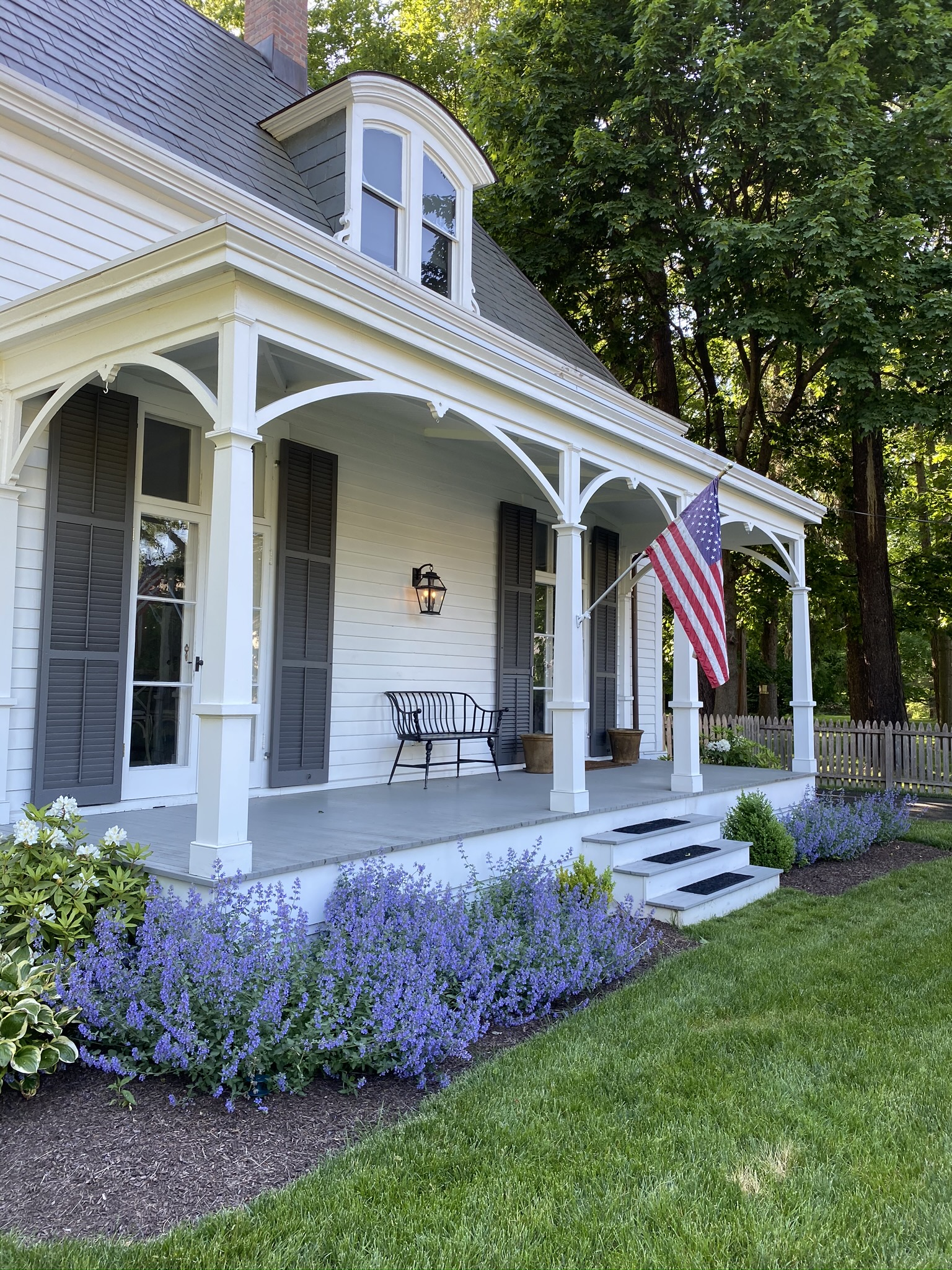

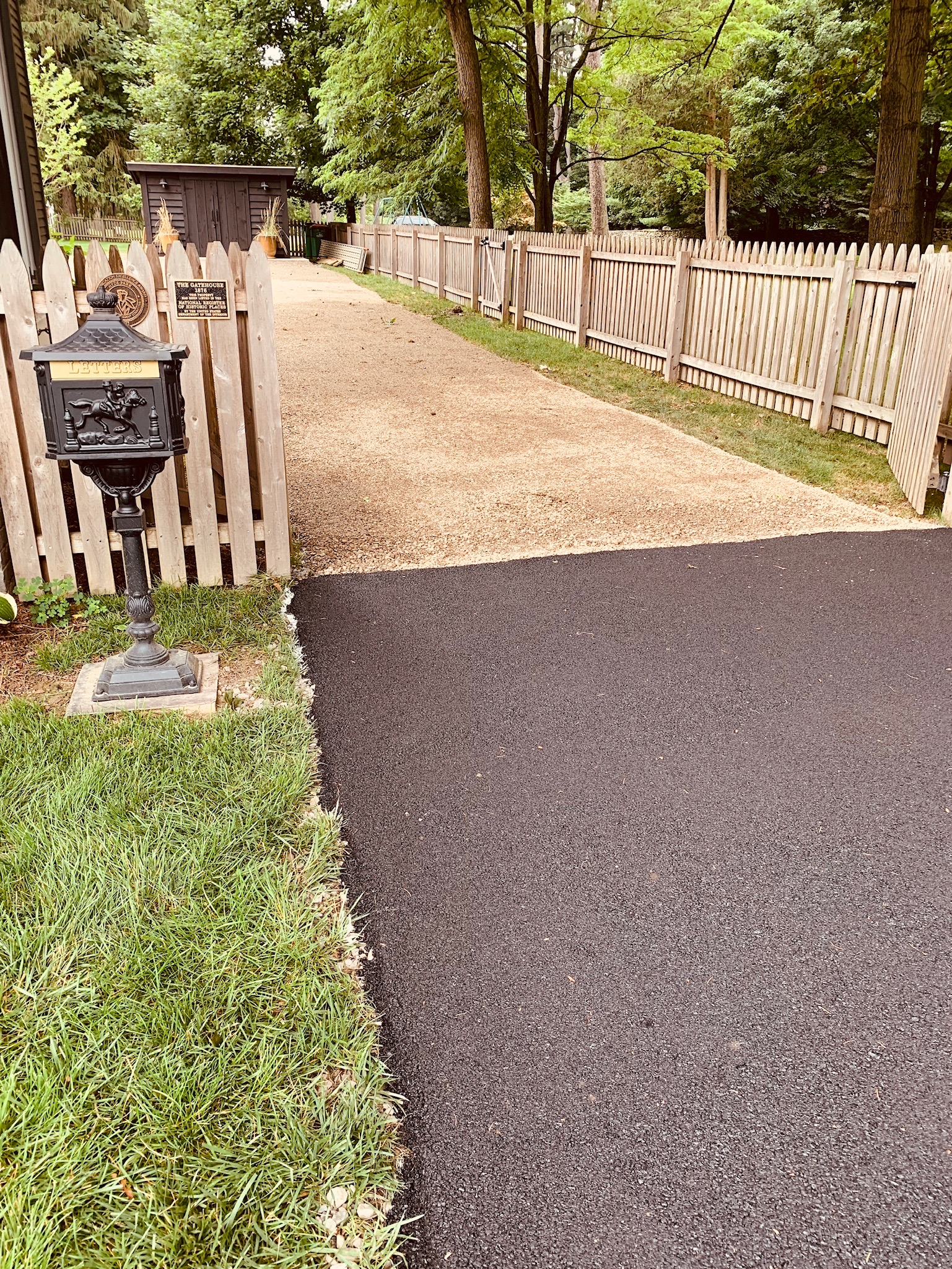

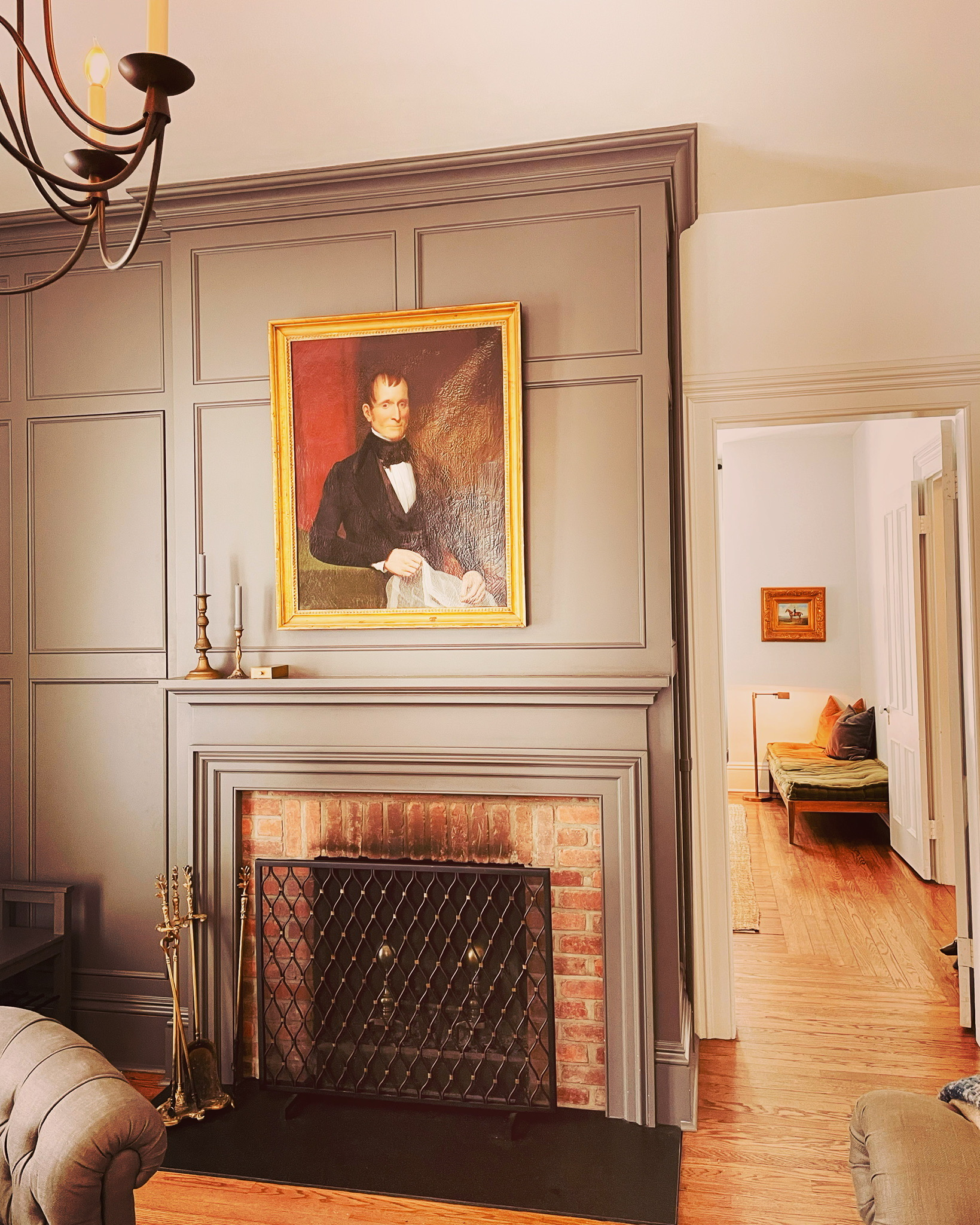

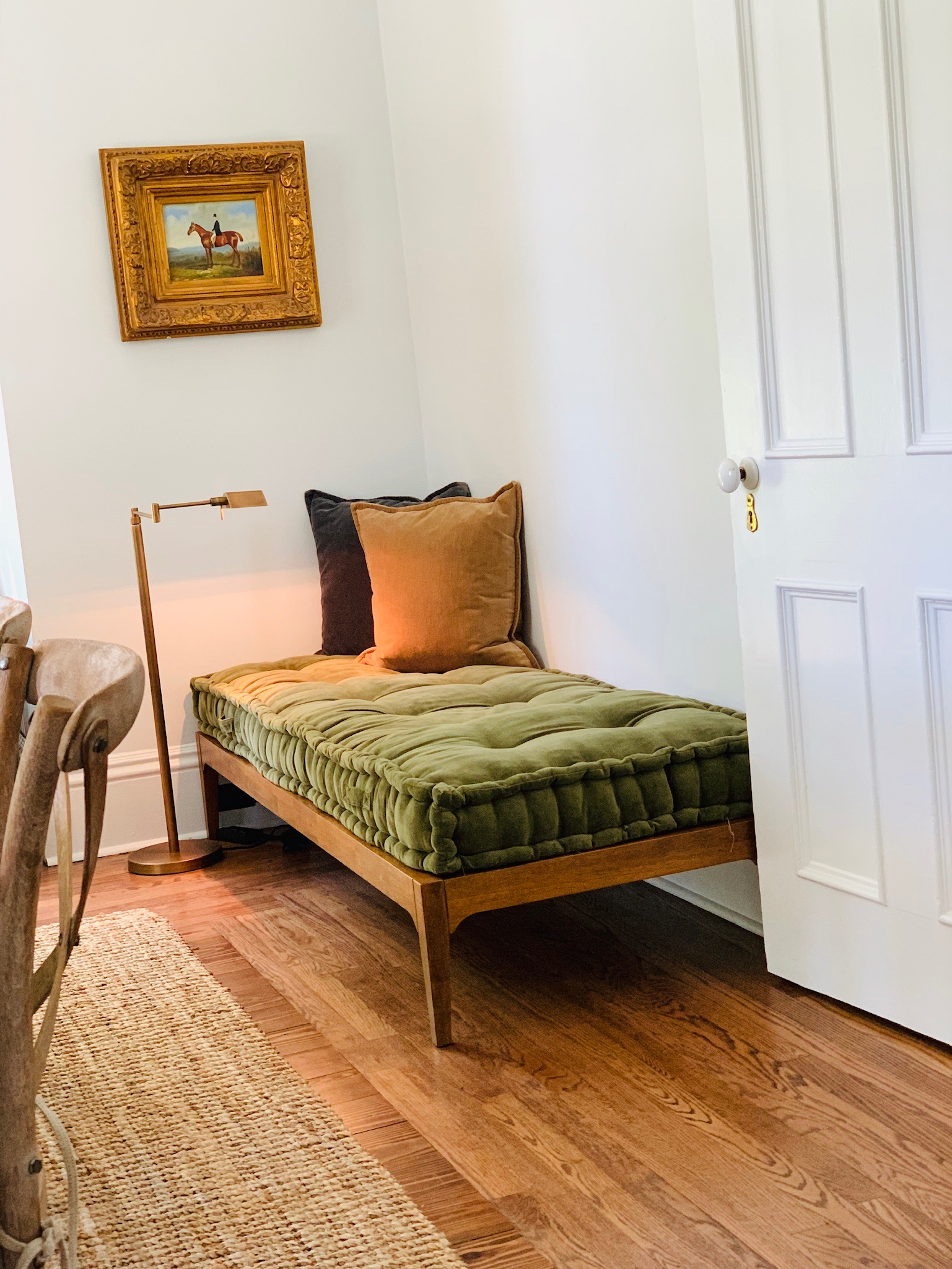

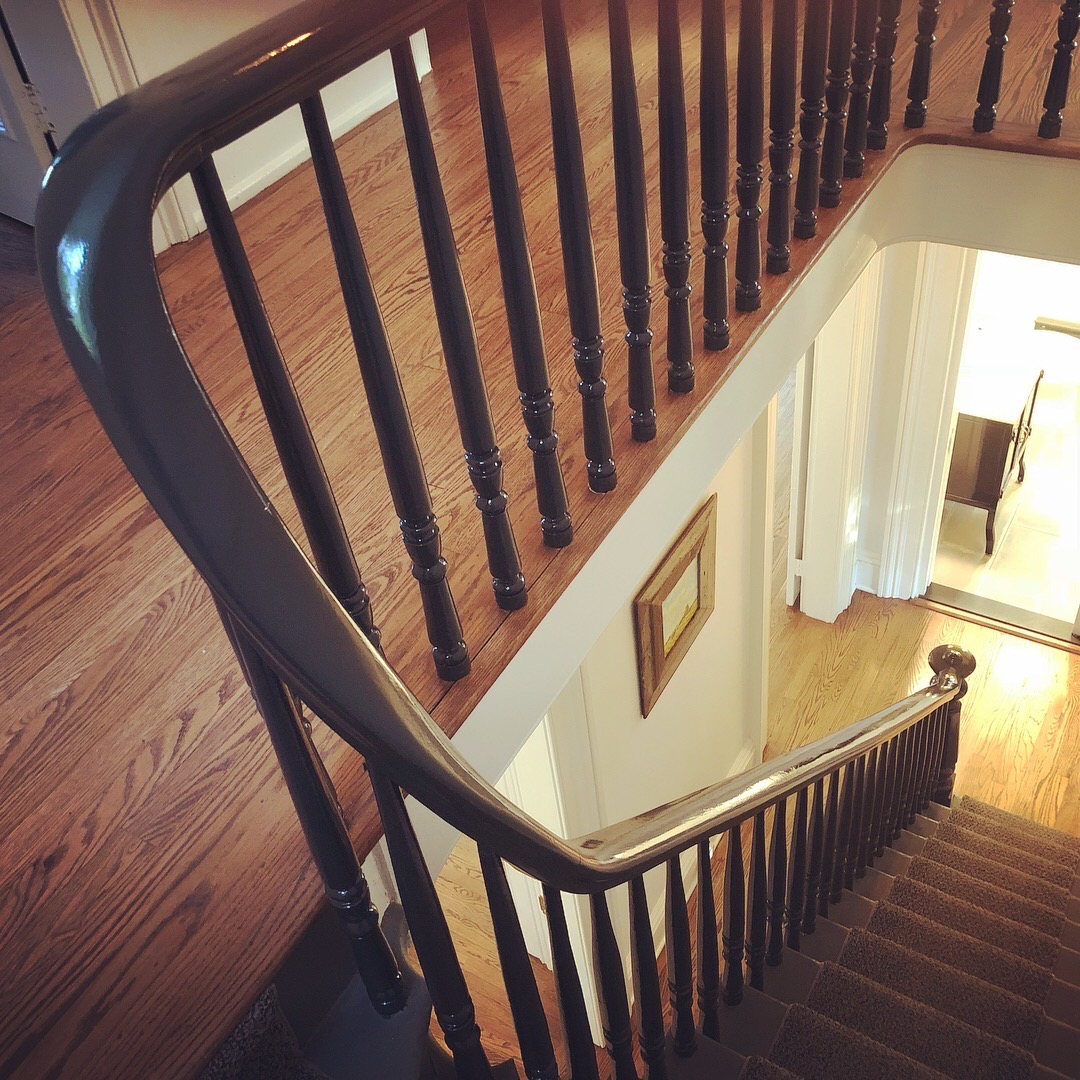
