= La Morte Amoureuse =

"La Morte amoureuse"
- Short story by Théophile Gautier
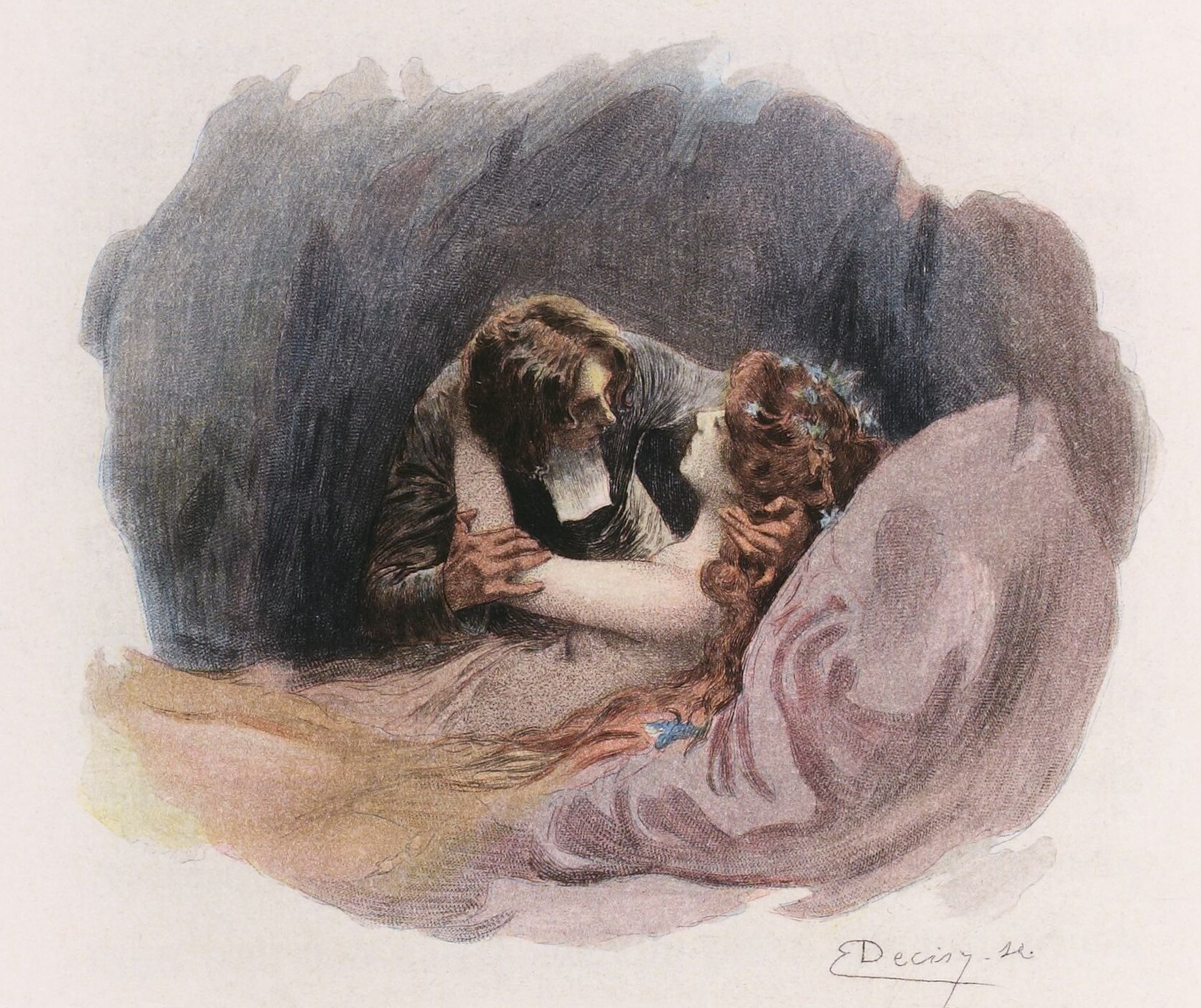
- "Her head fell back, but she still wrapped her arms around me as if to hold me back." Etching by Eugène Decisy after a watercolor by Paul Albert Laurens, 1904.
- Country: France
- Language: French
- Genres: Gothic, short story

Publication
- Published in: La Chronique de Paris
- Publication date: 1836

"La Morte amoureuse" (in English: "The Dead Woman in Love") is a short story written by Théophile Gautier and published in La Chronique de Paris in 1836. It tells the story of a priest named Romuald who falls in love with Clarimonde, a beautiful woman who turns out to be a vampire. In English translations the story has been titled "Clarimonde", "The Dead Leman", "The Dreamland Bride", or "The Vampire".

== Plot summary ==
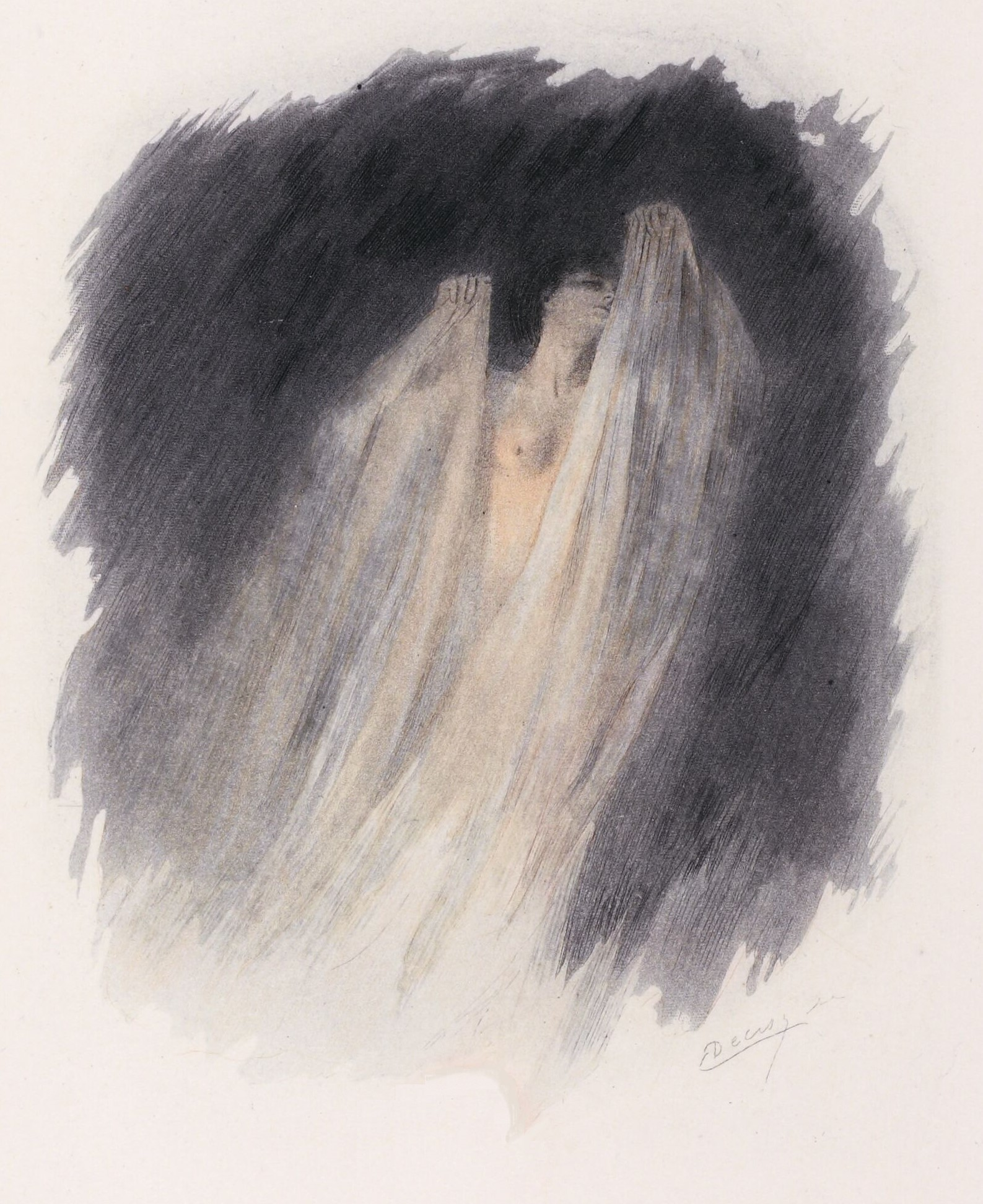
"She dissipated into the air like smoke, and I saw her no more." Etching by Decisy after Laurens, 1904.

The story opens with the elderly priest Romuald recounting the story of his first love, Clarimonde. On the day of his ordination many years ago, he sees a beautiful young woman in the church. He hears a woman's voice promising to love him and to make him happier than he would be in Paradise. Conflicted between "love at first sight" and his religious beliefs, he finishes the ceremony despite her entreaties. On his way back to the seminary, a page greets him and gives him a card reading: "Clarimonde, at the Palace Concini".

Romuald is stationed in a quiet location in the country and feels trapped by his priesthood. He continues his studies but is distracted and plagued by the memory of Clarimonde. Father Sérapion senses something is off with Romuald and tells him about the legend of the infamous Clarimonde the courtesan, who has recently died. Romuald asks Sérapion about the palace, and Sérapion answers that it is the Palace Concini, where Clarimonde lives. He informs Romuald that it is a place of great debauchery. Sérapion warns Romuald that it is not the first time Clarimonde has died. One night, a mysterious-looking man on horseback arrives to Romuald's parish, and asks for Romuald to come with him. They ride on horseback to a lavish castle in the country. As Romuald dismounts his horse, he is told that it is too late for the woman and that she's dead. He is led to the woman's chamber to perform the rites, only to discover that the woman is Clarimonde. In his grief, he kisses her, temporarily breathing life into her. She says they will shortly be reunited and Romuald faints as he sees her spirit leave.

Romuald believes all that had passed with Clarimonde had been a dream; but a few days later, she appears to him in his room. Clarimonde appears dead, but beautiful, and tells him to prepare for a trip. The two of them travel to Venice and live together. Clarimonde's health wavers and she seems to be dying, but she is restored after she drinks some of Romuald's blood from an accidental finger cut. Romuald realizes that Clarimonde is a vampire, but continues his relationship with her.

Father Sérapion pays a concerned visit to Romuald over his affairs with Clarimonde. Sérapion is adamant that Romuald's desires for Clarimonde are born from sin and takes Romuald to her tomb. He reveals her body is miraculously preserved thanks to Romuald's blood. Seeing blood on the corner of her lip, Father Sérapion becomes furious and calls her a demon as he pours holy water on her corpse. She crumbles into dust, but returns to Romuald later that night and admonishes him for his betrayal. She then vanishes forever.

Back in the present, Romuald tells his audience that this was the greatest regret of his life and suggests that his listeners never look at a woman lest they meet the same fate, even as he still misses Clarimonde.

Etchings by Eugène Decisy after watercolors by Paul Albert Laurens, Romagnol French edition of 1904

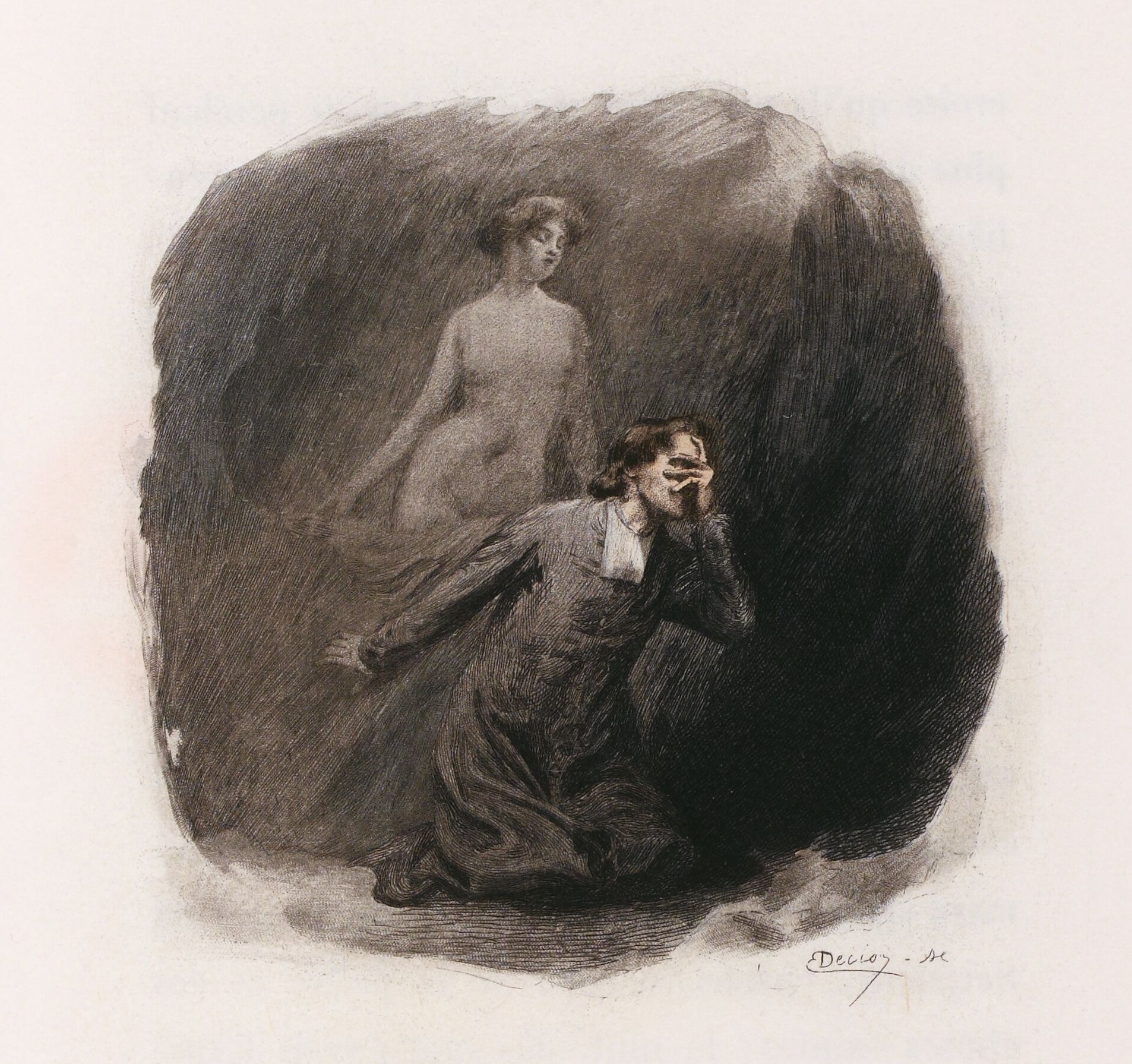
Romuald bitterly remembers his lost love.

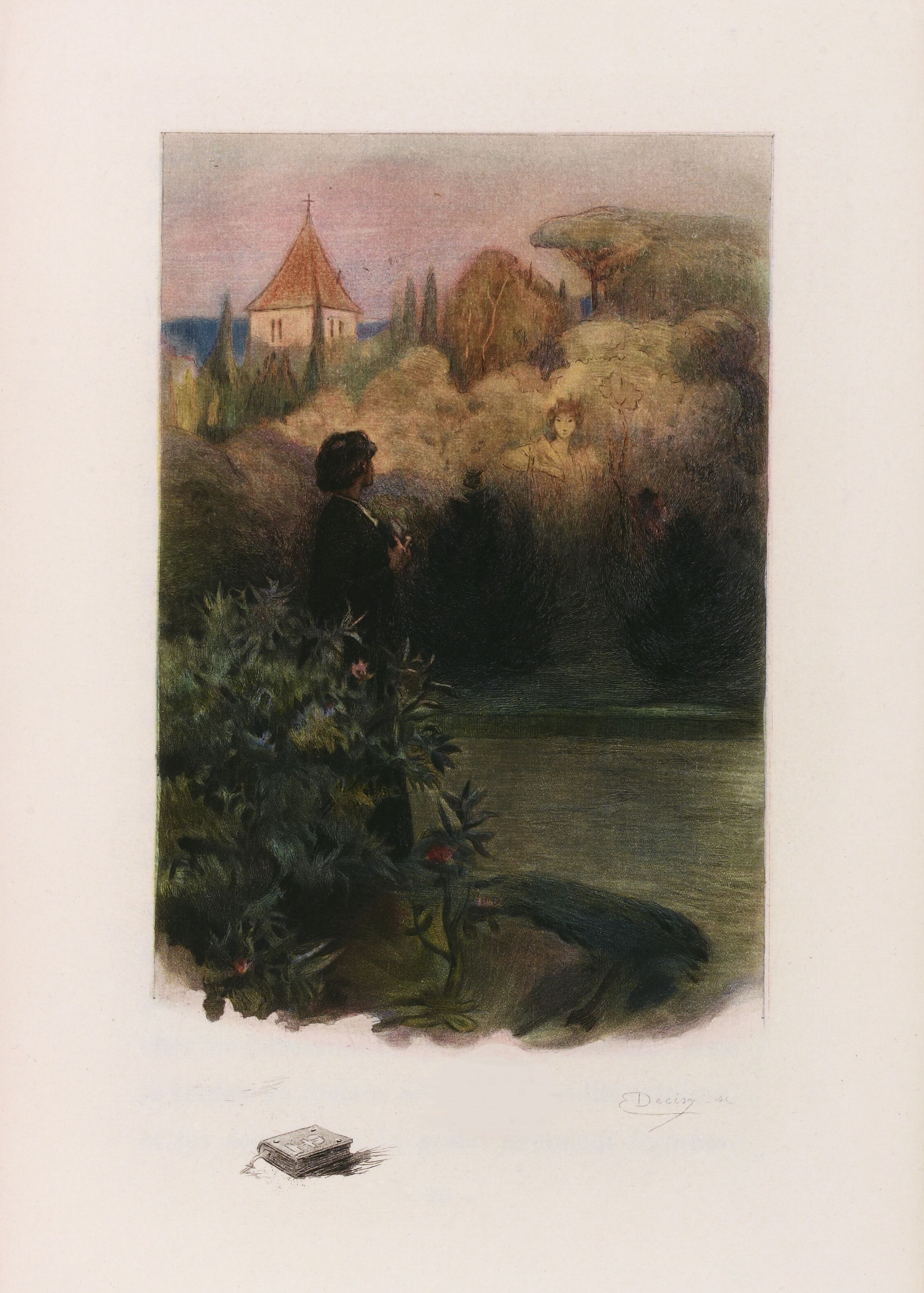
Romuald thinks he sees the silhouette of Clarimonde in his garden.

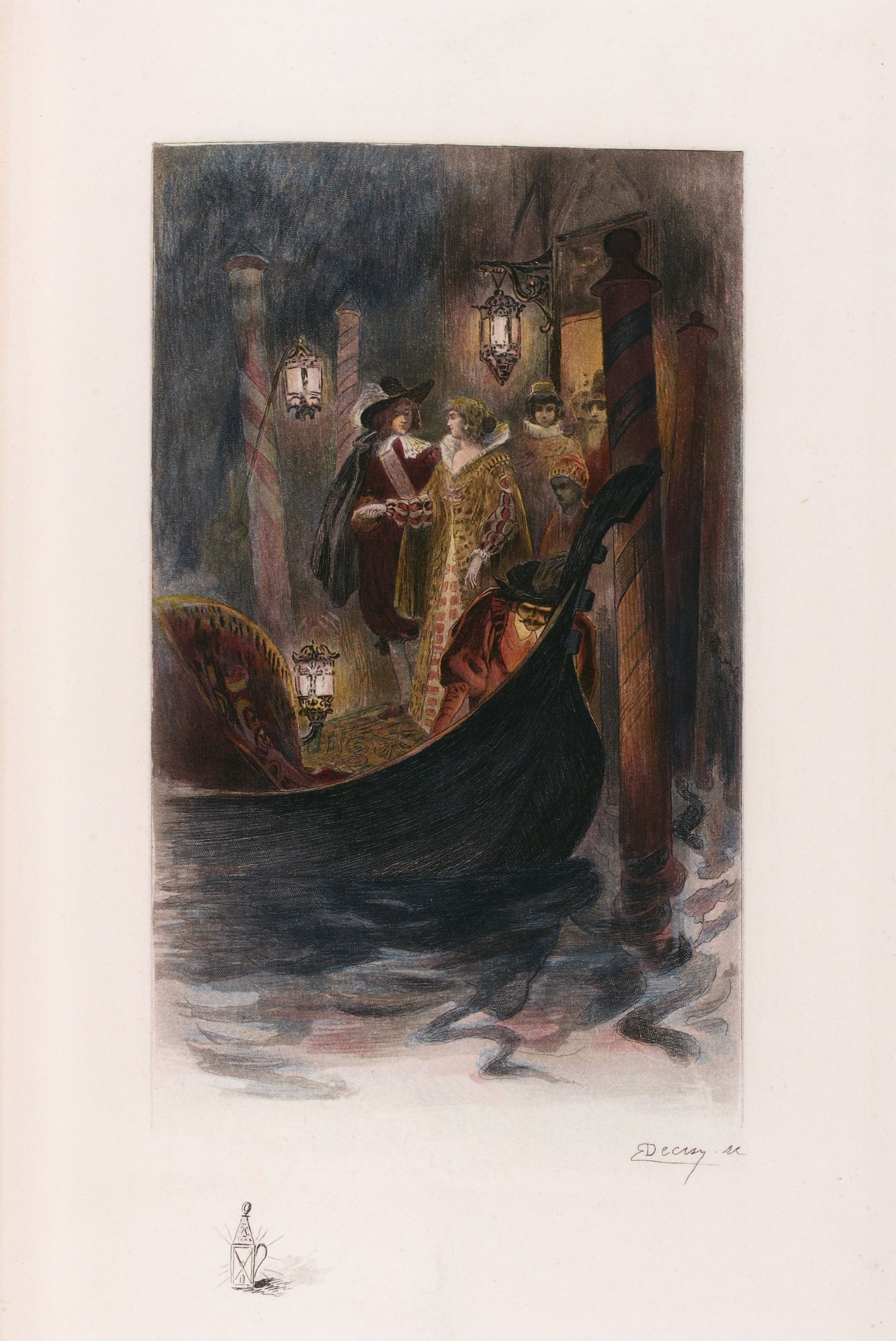
Romuald and Clarimonde lead a lavish existence in Venice.

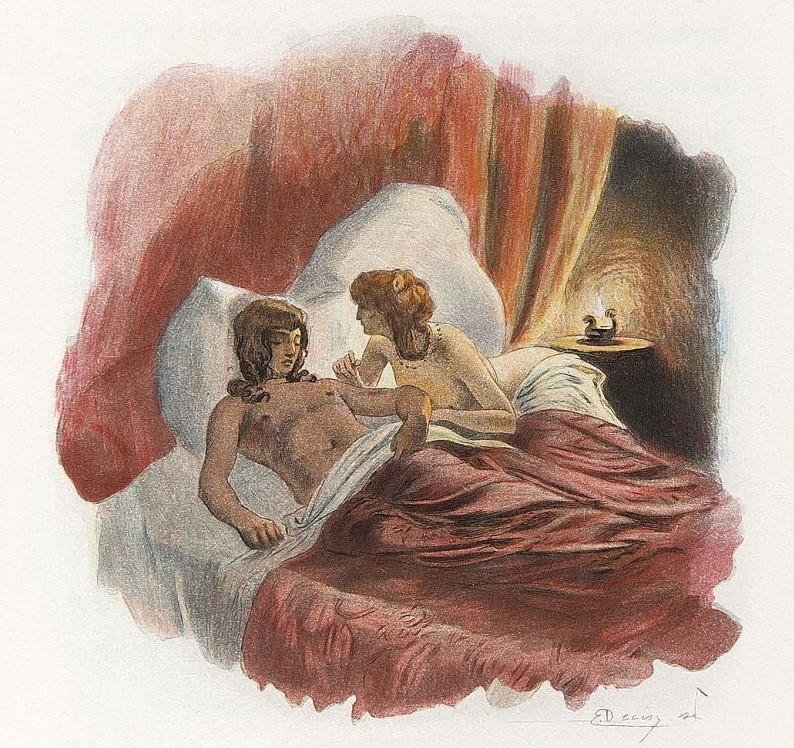
Clarimonde pricks Romuald's arm with a gold pin to feed on his blood.

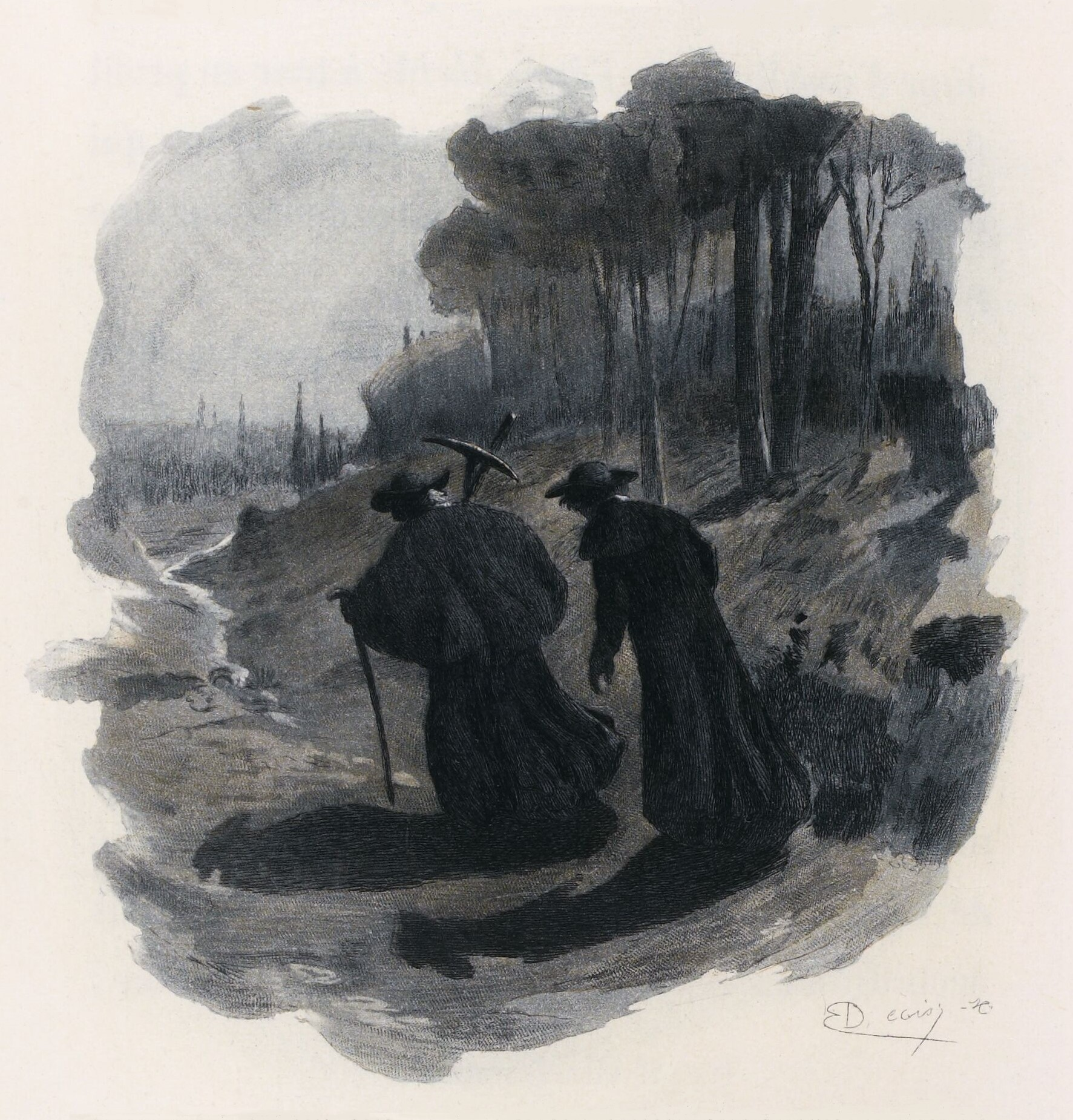
Father Sérapion leads Romuald to the cemetery where Clarimonde is buried.

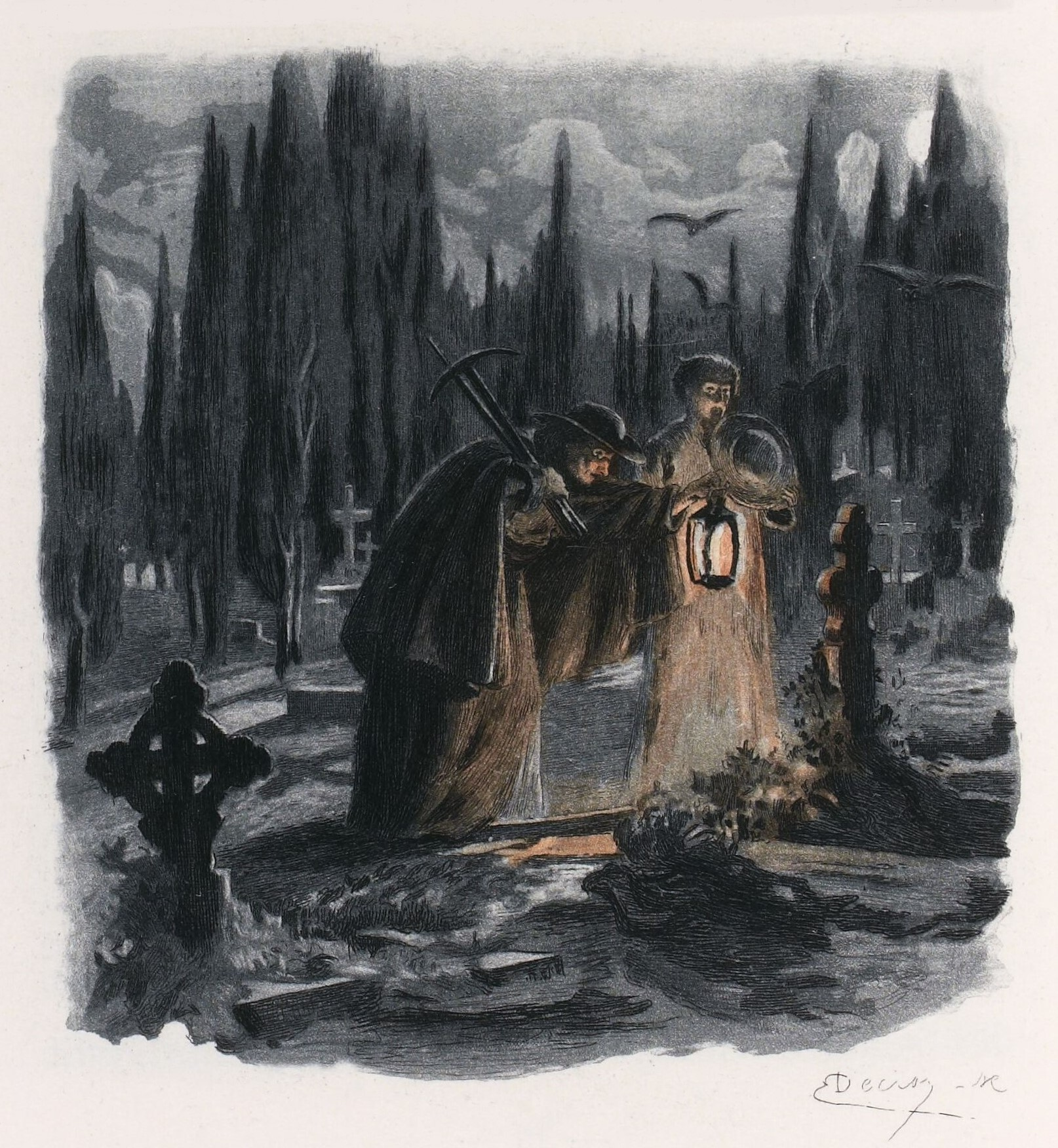
Serapion breaks Clarimonde's coffin.

== Characters ==
- Romuald, a young priest who falls in love with Clarimonde. Throughout the short story, Romuald struggles to reconcile two distinct parts of himself—one that wishes to be a celibate priest and one that wishes to be Clarimonde's lover.
- Clarimonde, a courtesan who is revealed to be a vampire. Her name suggests the embodiment of both good and evil. She survives by drinking Romuald's blood, but only taking what is needed (a few drops) for her vitality.
- Sérapion, a priest who discourages Romuald's relationship. He is solely linked to the Church and his intervention provides appropriate moral imperatives that Romuald is to follow as a priest.

== Themes ==
=== Life and Death ===
"La Morte amoureuse" plays with the boundaries between life and death. For example, as Clarimonde is a vampire, she is a creature of hybridity: one that comes from life and from death, neither fully monster nor human. It is through her hybrid nature that she is capable of traveling between the realms of life and death. Her reason for returning from the dead is love and her relationship with Romuald has been compared to the Platonic myth of Aristophanes.

Romuald, conflicted about his dual life, can also be regarded in the same manner: dead (or rather not living) during his priestly duties in the day, but alive and vivacious in the evenings as Il signor Romualdo, Clarimonde's lover.

=== Nightmare ===
Nightmares are culturally significant. Dreams and nightmares were often analyzed scientifically based on what appeared to the dreamer; for instance, certain colors equated to specific emotional states. Nightmares were considered to be a consequence of demon intervention and, more rarely, a side-effect of a psychological disorder. The nightmare, more literally, refers to as a bad dream or a black horse that sits on the chest of men and women at night and suffocates them to cause fear or terror. The terms incubus and succubus share the same Latin root. The two terms were birthed from the word concubinus and the term concumbre (to lie alongside). In the text, Romuald refers to the horse that carries him to Clarimonde's castle as a ghost of the famous horse "Nightmare." The nightmare presented in Gautier's text relates to his time with Clarimonde as being dream-like. Nocturnal demons are associated with erotic dreams and the time that Romauld shares with Clarimonde in his dream-space is certainly erotic. Romuald may not be dreaming of living in Clarimonde's world, but rather, Clarimonde may be inventing Romuald to satisfy her own desires. In this case, Romuald is the nightmare and not Clarimonde.

=== Love is greater than death ===
The plot of Théophile Gautier's French romantic short story "La Morte Amoureuse" focuses on the idea that love can overcome death. For example, when the protagonist, Romuald, is called to give last rites to a great courtesan who has fallen ill, he recognizes her as Clarimonde. The same Clarimonde who had, earlier in the short story, fallen in love with Romuald at first sight during his ordination. Without realizing it he had fallen in love with her also. So when he goes to her in the castle, instead of giving her last rites and allowing her to die, he decides to kiss her. So, with the power of his love for her passing through his lips, Romuald kisses Clarimonde and brings her back to life.

Both characters fall in love despite the oppositions of both of their worlds; for Romuald, that of God and the church, and for Clarimonde, that of Satan (woman and pleasure). These two traditionally opposed realms of existence create a divide in what is considered the physical and metaphysical. Their love, in other words, transcends both realms and exists to defy physical and metaphysical laws.

=== Allegory ===
The plot can be read as an allegory in which Clarimonde, a manifestation of Romuald's sexual desires, is the devil luring man, represented through Romuald, to sin through temptation. The allegorical interpretation of the story is embodied by Clarimonde's desire to break Romuald’s priestly vows of chastity through seducing him, Romuald’s mutual desire for her, and contrasting descriptions of her as "divine" from a distance and "cold as a serpent’s skin" when touched.

A second allegorical interpretation is also possible. According to Virginia Marino, "Clarimonde nevertheless represents the life force and its inescapable physicality," both through surviving in the world of the living as an undead vampire and through Gautier's persistent physical comparisons of her to the "four elements" of nature: air, fire, water, and earth. By becoming a priest, Romuald is dedicating himself to a life of restraint that Clarimonde persistently tries to undermine. Though Romuald is living, the priesthood, and therefore Romuald, is associated with death through self-restraint of human desire. Additionally, Marino states that "the narrator suddenly feels life rise in him...when he sees her."

=== Femmes fatales ===
"La Morte Amoureuse" follows the trope of femmes fatales, the fatality to the male victim from female seduction. Femmes fatales are often depicted in medieval literature as an alluring woman who leads men into harmful situations. The story begins with an elderly Romuald answering the question if he has ever loved. He answers that he has but describes this occurrence as a "bewitchment to which [he] fell victim". Clarimonde shows up in Romuald's life during the day of his ordination and is described by Romuald as "a young woman of rare beauty". From this moment onward, Romuald is encaptured by Clarimonde's beauty and is taken away from his life as a priest to live in Venice with Clarimonde, who is later revealed to be a vampire who survives by drinking his blood as he sleeps.

Clarimonde is extremely looked down upon by Father Sérapion, and her fate at the end of the story shows that she was not worthy of keeping alive. Romuald's constant guilt and fear of his love for Clarimonde shows that he knows he should not be involved with her; yet his lust and Clarimonde's sexuality outweighs his conscience. Several of Gautier's works have this sort of female archetype. "Omphale" and "Arria Marcella" are both stories involving femme fatale women.

=== Eroticism ===
Clarimonde is a vampire and like Dracula she represents "the highest symbolic representation of eroticism" in Gautier's short story. This is a different take on the vampire theme, since most vampires are males who seduce females. In this story, it is the female vampire who seduces a young man. The most famous vampire, Dracula, is often the object of woman's desire but here, the genders are switched and Clarimonde becomes the lover in the story. The scenes where she sucks on his blood are erotic moments in the story and brings Romuald into a higher state. The fantastic can also be viewed of a longing or desire that may not be known to us.

=== Blood ===
Blood is an important theme in this story because it is what keeps Clarimonde alive. Without Romuald's blood she would die and thus it links the two characters. Oftentimes fantastic themes incorporate this dark and violent setting. Included are themes about the afterlife and that is where vampires come in because vampires represent immortality but they also represent it in the living dead.

=== The Other ===
The other is represented here as Clarimonde. Her history shows her to be a courtesan and she is described as being beautiful beyond reproach. The rumors around her orgies are meant to depict her as being evil but they also are meant to exploit her sexuality. She represents all that is evil and even Romuald struggles with living between hedonism and a man of the cloth.

== Analysis ==
=== Academic Discourse (Gautier) ===
Gautier is considered a "realist" and romantic to a certain extent since he portrays the context of love. Epstein asserts that such "poetic metaphors express obsessions". Thus, these metaphors tend to be private and are within the state of malaise. In Gautier's stories, the heroes are bound to desire of sexuality. Based on Gautier's academic discourse, his work is categorized as "fulfillment dreams and as anxiety dreams". His tales are often fantasies with irony and a dream sequence. In La Morte Amoureuse, the priest who falls in love with Clarimonde experiences a sense of anxiety. Once Clarimonde dies, she becomes a vampire and is constantly possessing the priest throughout the story. In this story, Gautier is indicating that possession in the materialistic world is a sin, or considered "damnation". Overall, Gautier's work emphasizes desires, dreams, and fantasies throughout.

== Adaptations ==
- The Vampire Happening (Gebissen wird nur nachts, 1971), a vampire sex comedy made in West Germany, features a subplot with the vampire and "scarlet woman" Clarimonde seducing a monk.
- "Clarimonde" (1998), an episode written by Gerard Wexler for the TV series The Hunger, is a rather faithful adaptation, but this time Clarimonde is a succubus and old witch, who keeps herself beautiful by sex.
- Clarimonde is also the name of a mysterious woman in the 1908 short story "The Spider" by the German author Hanns Heinz Ewers. She seems to seduce men into suicide and disappears afterward.
- Clarimonde, an opera by composer Frédéric Chaslin and librettist P. H. Fisher, is an adaptation of Gautier's story.
- Adapted as "The Possessive Dead", an episode of the American radio series The Weird Circle broadcast 3/25/1945.
