= Béatrix =

1839 novel by Honoré de Balzac

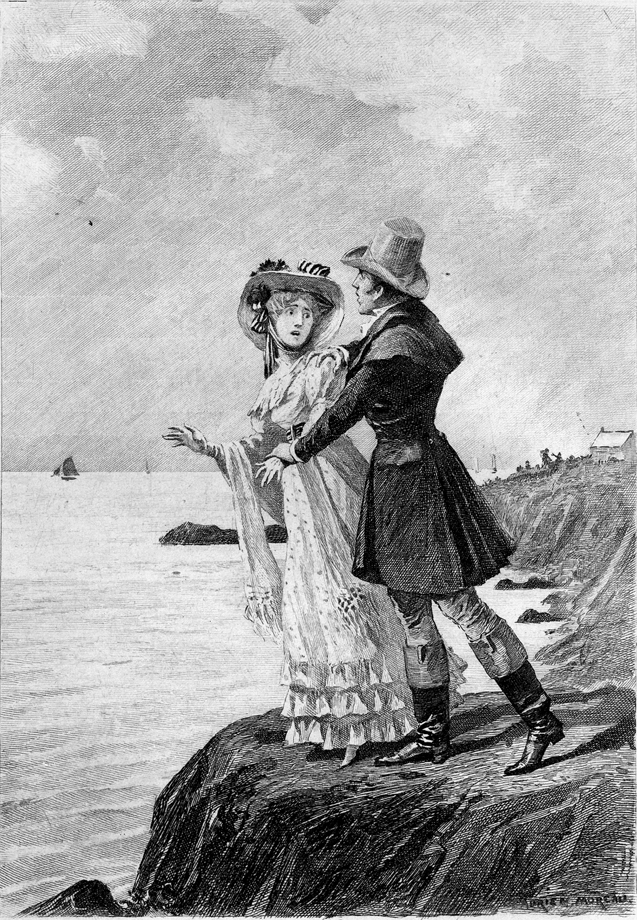
- Title page of Béatrix. Philadelphia: George Barrie & Son, 1897. The scene depicts Béatrix de Rochefide and Calyste du Guénic.
- Author: Honoré de Balzac
- Language: French
- Series: La Comédie humaine
- Publication date: 1839
- Publication place: France
- Preceded by: Honorine (novel)
- Followed by: Gobseck

Béatrix is an 1839 novel by French author Honoré de Balzac (1799–1850) and included in the Scènes de la vie privée section of his novel sequence La Comédie humaine.

It first appeared in the periodical Le Siècle in August 1839, and appeared in volume form the same year. Balzac based the characters in this novel on real figures: Félicité des Touches, a celebrated musician and writer, is based on George Sand. Béatrix de Rochefide is based on Marie d'Agoult (who wrote under the pen name of Daniel Stern); Gennaro Conti is based on Franz Liszt; Claude Vignon is based on Gustave Planche.

== Plot ==
A handsome young man named Calyste du Guénic is in love with the older woman, Félicité des Touches, a famous writer who uses the pen name of Camille Maupin. Félicité at first does not reciprocate Calyste's feelings, and Calyste falls in love with the blonde marchioness Béatrix de Rochefide. Béatrix is a beautiful but selfish woman; one critic remarked in 1897 in regards to Béatrix that “for cold-blooded cruelty and vulgarity she is unexampled, and her efforts to keep her youth and her hold over men are drawn in Balzac’s heaviest and most pitiless manner.”

Béatrix had already had an affair with Gennaro Conti, and Calyste has an additional rival in the form of Claude Vignon. Félicité des Touches (Camille Maupin) tries to help Calyste win Béatrix's heart, thus sacrificing her own. Calyste's efforts are ultimately a failure, and Béatrix is taken away by Gennaro Conti.

Calyste is devastated by his failure, but promises his dying father to get married. Félicité des Touches enters a convent, but before she does, she uses her fortune to arrange a marriage for Calyste with a woman named Sabine de Grandlieu. When Calyste encounters Béatrix again in Paris, his wife Sabine struggles to win back her husband's affections after Calyste falls for Béatrix again. Subsequently, through the intercession of Count Maxime de Trailles, Béatrix falls for another young man, and Calyste comes to his senses.

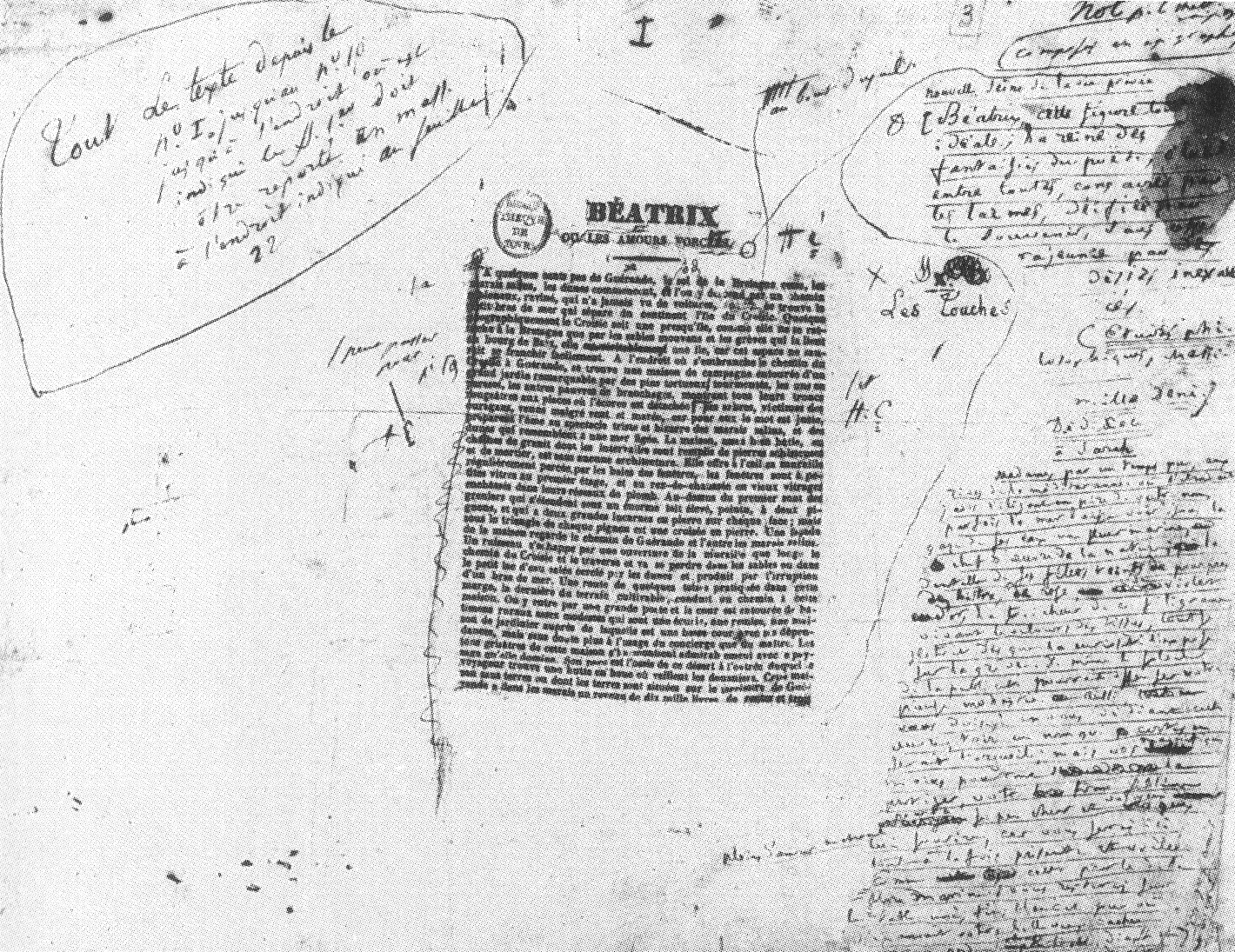
First page of the first proofs of Béatrix

Balzac describes Béatrix as follows:

She is slender and straight and white as a church taper; her face is long and pointed; the skin is capricious, to-day like cambric, to-morrow darkened with little speckles beneath its surface, as if her blood had left a deposit of dust there during the night. Her forehead is magnificent, though rather daring. The pupils of her eyes are pale sea-green, floating on their white balls under thin lashes and lazy eyelids. Her eyes have dark rings around them often; her nose, which describes one-quarter of a circle, is pinched about the nostrils; very shrewd and clever, but supercilious. She has an Austrian mouth; the upper lip has more character than the lower, which drops disdainfully. Her pale cheeks have no color unless some very keen emotion moves her. Her chin is rather fat; mine is not thin, and perhaps I do wrong to tell you that women with fat chins are exacting in love. She has one of the most exquisite waists I ever saw; the shoulders are beautiful, but the bust has not developed as well, and the arms are thin. She has, however, an easy carriage and manner, which redeems all such defects and sets her beauties in full relief.

— Honoré de Balzac, Béatrix
