= John Jacob Astor =

German-born American businessman (1763–1848)

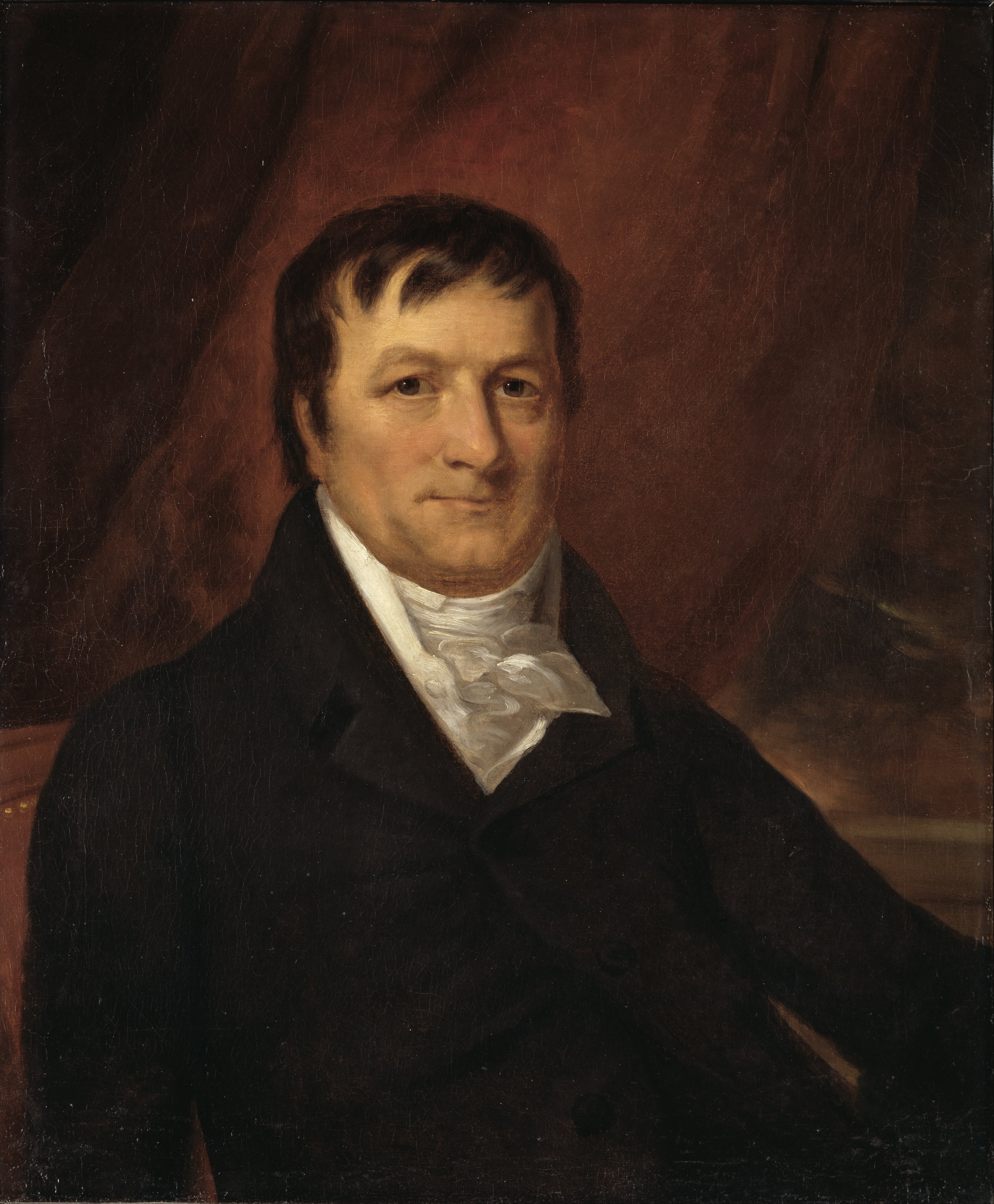
- Portrait by John Wesley Jarvis, c. 1825
- Born: Johann Jakob Astor (Note: Jacob was always written with a 'c' in the records of Walldorf's Reformed Church, but Walldorf's Rev. Georg Speyer spelled the name with a 'k' in his laudatio for Astor's 50th death-ceremony. From then on that spelling was used in Astor's hometown (Ebeling 1998b, p. 2).); July 17, 1763; Walldorf, Electoral Palatinate, Holy Roman Empire
- Died: March 29, 1848 (aged 84); New York City, U.S.
- Burial place: Trinity Church Cemetery
- Occupations: Businessman; merchant; real estate mogul; investor; fur trader
- Known for: First multi-millionaire businessman in the United States
- Spouse: Sarah Cox Todd (m. 1785; died 1832)
- Children: 8, including William
- Relatives: See Astor family

Signature
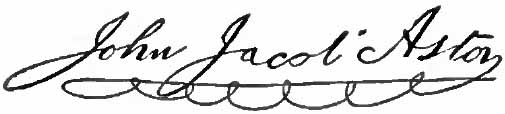

John Jacob Astor (born Johann Jakob Astor; July 17, 1763 – March 29, 1848) was a German-born American businessman, merchant, real estate mogul, and investor. Astor made his fortune mainly in a fur trade monopoly, by exporting opium into the Chinese Empire, and by investing in real estate in or around New York City during the late 18th and early 19th centuries. He was the first prominent member of the Astor family and the first multi-millionaire in the United States.

Born in Germany, Astor immigrated to England as a teenager and worked as a musical instrument manufacturer. He moved to the United States after the American Revolutionary War (1775–1783). Seeing the expansion of population to the west, Astor entered the fur trade and built a monopoly, managing a business empire that extended to the Great Lakes region and north into British North America (future Dominion of Canada). It later expanded into the Western United States and the American frontier West and extended to the far West Coast and Pacific Ocean.

Following a decline in demand due to changing European styles and tastes in beaver fur mens' hats and clothing tastes, he got out of the fur trade in 1830, diversifying by investing in New York City real estate. Astor became one of the wealthiest men in the United States and became a prominent patron of the arts.

At the time of his death, Astor's estate was estimated to be $20 to $30 million, roughly equivalent to $744 million to $1.12 billion in 2025. In proportion to the GDP, he was one of the richest people in modern history, with 0.9% to 1.35% of the US GDP at his time of death. This was previously popularised by Nathaniel P. Tallmadge remarking "one in every 100 dollars in this country ends up in J Astor's hands" during Tallmadge's 1839–1840 campaign for the U.S. Senate.

== Early life ==
Johann Jakob Astor was born in 1763 in Walldorf, a town near Heidelberg in the Electoral Palatinate, which is in the present-day German state of Baden-Württemberg. He was the youngest son of Johann Jacob Astor and Maria Magdalena vom Berg. His three older brothers were George, Henry, and Melchior. In his childhood, Johann worked in his father's butcher shop and as a dairy salesman.

The Astor family ancestors were Waldensians who had presumably fled France due to religious persecution. In 1779, at the age of 16, he moved to London to join his brother George in working for an uncle's piano and flute manufacturer, Astor & Broadwood. While there, he learned English and anglicized his name to John Jacob Astor.

== Migration to the United States ==
In November 1783, just after the end of the American Revolutionary War, Astor boarded a ship for the United States, arriving in Baltimore around March 1784. There, he rented a room from Sarah Cox Todd, a widow, and began a flirtation with his landlady's daughter, also named Sarah Cox Todd. The young couple married in 1785. His intent had been to join his brother Henry, who had established a butcher shop in New York City.

A chance meeting with a fur trader on his voyage inspired him to join the North American fur trade as well. After working at his brother's shop for a time, Astor began to purchase raw hides from Native Americans, prepare them himself, and resell them in London and elsewhere at great profit. In the late 1780s, he opened his own fur goods shop in New York and served as the New York agent of his uncle's musical instrument business. In 1789, along with William Dubois & Robert Stodart, he co-founded the Francis Bacon Piano Company.

=== Fortune from fur trade ===
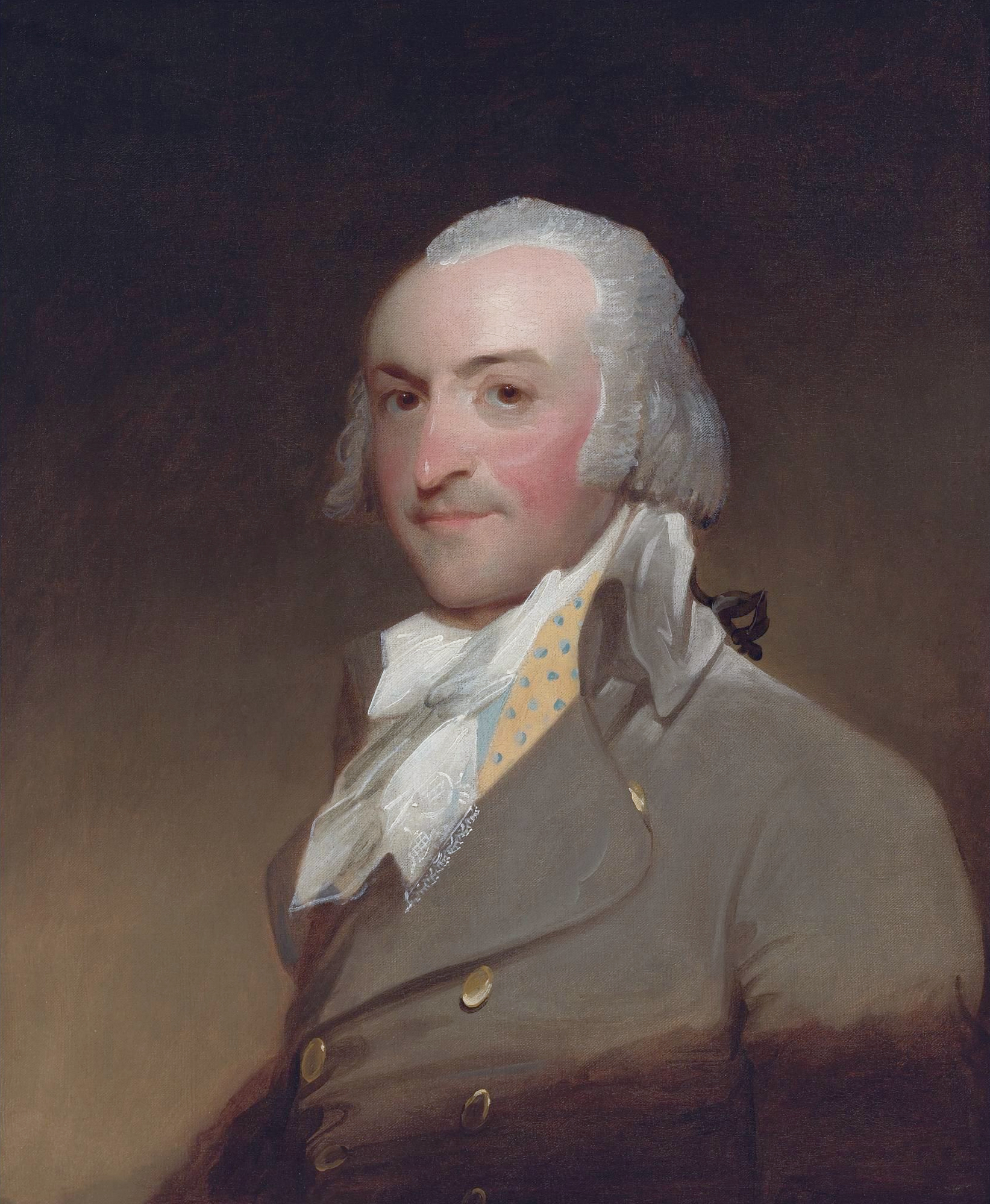
John Jacob Astor, by Gilbert Stuart, c. 1794

Astor took advantage of the 1794 Jay Treaty between Great Britain and the United States, which opened new markets in Canada and the Great Lakes region. In London, Astor at once made a contract with the North West Company, which from Montreal rivaled the trade interests of the Hudson's Bay Company, then based in London.

Astor imported furs from Montreal to New York and shipped them to Europe. By 1800, he had amassed over a quarter of a million dollars (equivalent to about $470 million in 2025) and had become one of the leading figures in the fur trade. His agents worked throughout the western areas and were ruthless in competition. In 1800, following the example of the Empress of China, the first American trading vessel to China, Astor traded mostly opium, but also, furs, teas, and sandalwood at the port of Canton in China, and greatly benefited from it.

The U.S. Embargo Act of 1807 disrupted Astor's import/export business because it closed off trade with Canada. With the permission of President Thomas Jefferson, Astor established the American Fur Company on April 6, 1808. He later formed subsidiaries: the Pacific Fur Company, and the Southwest Fur Company, in which Canadians had a part, in order to control fur trading in the Great Lakes areas and Columbia River region.

His Columbia River trading post at Fort Astoria, established in April 1811, was the first United States community on the Pacific coast. He financed the overland Astor Expedition in 1810–1812 to reach the outpost. Members of the expedition discovered South Pass, through which hundreds of thousands of settlers on the Oregon, Mormon, and California Trails later used to pass through the Rocky Mountains.

Astor's fur trading ventures were disrupted during the War of 1812, when the British captured his trading posts. In 1816, he joined the opium smuggling trade. His American Fur Company purchased ten tons of Ottoman-produced opium, and shipped the contraband to Canton onboard the packet ship Macedonian. Astor later left the Chinese opium trade and sold opium solely in Britain.

In 1817, Astor's business rebounded after the U.S. Congress passed a protectionist law that barred foreign fur traders from U.S. territories. The American Fur Company came to dominate trading in the area around the Great Lakes, absorbing competitors in a monopoly. Astor had a townhouse at 233 Broadway in New York and a country estate, Hellgate, in the northern part of the city.

In 1822, Astor established the Robert Stuart House on Mackinac Island in Michigan as headquarters for the reorganized American Fur Company, making the island a metropolis of the fur trade. Washington Irving described this at length, based on contemporary documents, diaries, etc., in his travelogue Astoria. Astor's commercial connections extended over the entire globe, and his ships were found in every sea.

=== Real estate and retirement ===
Astor began buying land in New York City in 1799 and acquired sizable holdings along the waterfront. After the start of the 19th century, flush with China trade profits, he became more systematic, ambitious, and calculating by investing in New York real estate. In 1803, he bought a 70-acre farm where he built the Astor Mansion at Hellgate. The property ran from York Avenue to the East River [Map of Manhattan, as laid out by the Commissioners Appointed by the Legislature, April 3d. 1807 https://digitalcollections.nypl.org/items/b52c3410-0f64-0132-a724-58d385a7b928?canvasIndex=0]. In 1803 and 1804, he bought considerable holdings from the disgraced Aaron Burr.

In the 1830s, Astor foresaw that the next big boom would be the build-up of New York, which would soon emerge as one of the world's greatest cities. Astor sold his interests in the American Fur Company, and all his other ventures, and used the money to buy and develop large tracts of Manhattan Island real estate. Astor correctly predicted New York's rapid growth northward on Manhattan, and he purchased more and more land beyond the then-existing city limits. Astor rarely built on his land, but leased it to others for rent and their use. After retiring from his business, Astor spent the rest of his life as a patron of culture. He supported the ornithologist John James Audubon in his studies, artwork, and travels, and the presidential campaign of Henry Clay.

== Personal life ==
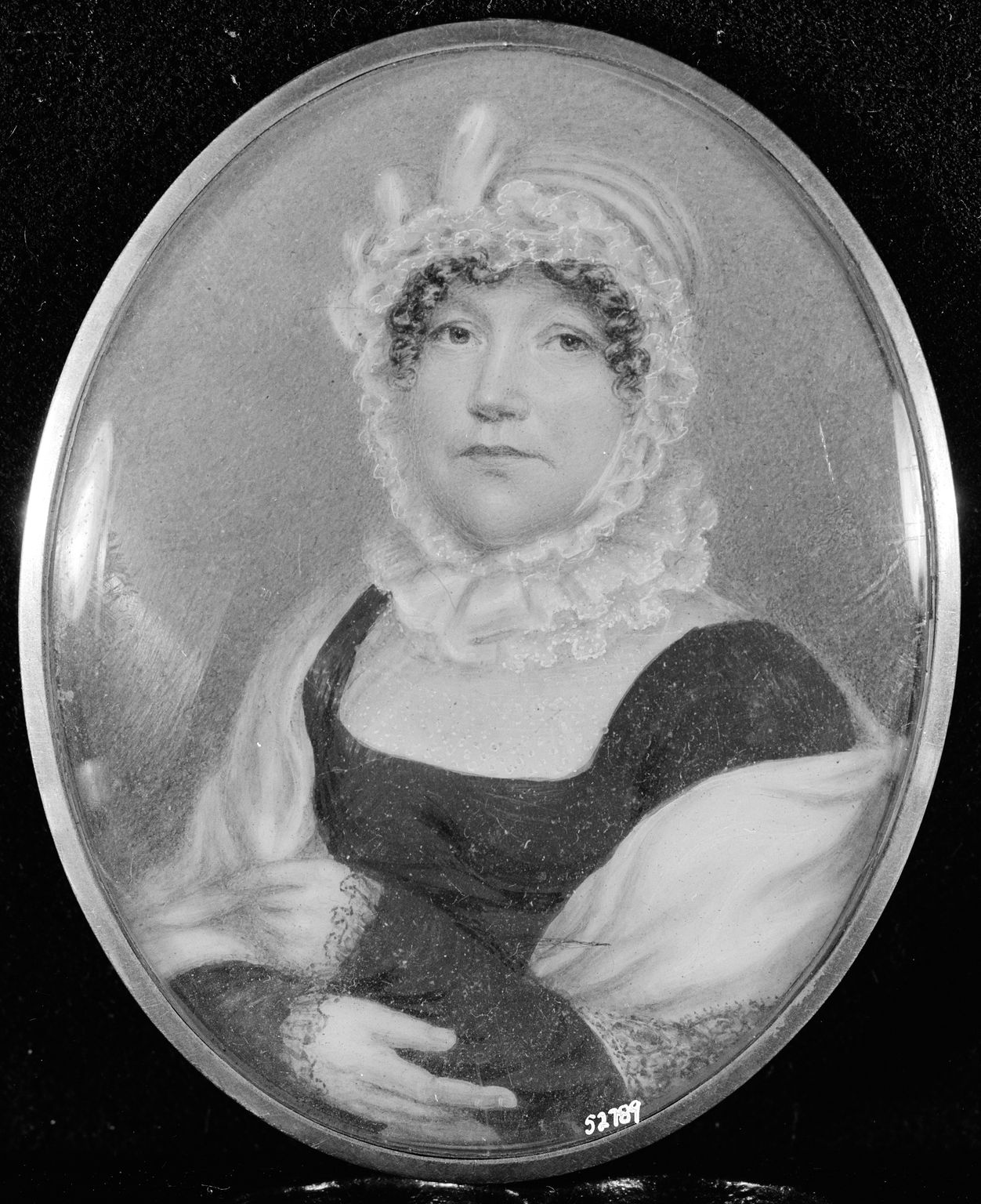
Sarah Cox Todd

On September 19, 1785, Astor married Sarah Cox Todd (April 9, 1762 – August 3, 1832). Her parents were Scottish immigrants Adam Todd and Sarah Cox. Although she brought him a dowry of only $300 (equivalent to $7,000 in 2025), she possessed a frugal mind and a business judgment that he declared better than that of most merchants. She assisted him in the practical details of his business, and managed Astor's affairs when he was away from New York. He and Sarah moved to a townhouse on Prince Street in New York.

They had eight children. Magdalena Astor (1788–1832) first married Adrian Benjamin Bentzon in 1807, and then John Bristed in 1820. She was the mother of Charles Astor Bristed. Sarah Todd Astor (1790–1790) was stillborn. John Jacob Astor Jr. (1791–1869) was sickly and mentally unstable. William Backhouse Astor Sr. (1792–1875) who married Margaret Alida Rebecca Armstrong, daughter of Senator John Armstrong Jr., in 1818.

Dorothea Astor (1795–1874) married Walter Langdon. They owned the Langdon Estate Gatehouse. Henry Astor II (1797–1799) died as a child. Eliza Astor (1801–1838) married Vincent Rumpff. An unnamed son (1802–1802) died within a few days of his birth.

=== Fraternal organizations ===
Astor belonged to the Freemasons, a fraternal order, and served as Master of Holland Lodge #8, New York City in 1788. Later he served as Grand Treasurer for the Grand Lodge of New York. He was president of the German Society of the City of New York from 1837 to 1841.

== Death ==
Astor died on March 29, 1848 in New York City. Astor is buried in Trinity Church Cemetery in Manhattan. Many members of his family had joined its congregation, but Astor remained a member of the local German Reformed congregation to his death. At the time of his death in 1848, Astor was the wealthiest person in the United States, leaving an estate estimated to be worth between $20 and $30 million, (equivalent to about $740 million to $1.1 billion in 2025) or 0.9% to 1.35% of estimated US GDP at the time.

Astor left the bulk of his fortune to his second son William, because his eldest son, John Jr., was sickly and mentally unstable. Astor left enough money to care for John Jr. for the rest of his life. William continued building the family fortune, and was an ancestor of John Jacob Astor III, John Jacob Astor IV, John Jacob Astor V, John Jacob Astor VI and John Jacob Astor VII.

== Legacy ==
In his will, Astor bequeathed $400,000 to build the Astor Library and its building for the New York public, which was later consolidated with other libraries to form the New York Public Library. He also left $50,000 for a poorhouse and orphanage in his German hometown of Walldorf. The Astorhaus is now operated as a museum honoring Astor. It is a renowned and popular fest hall for marriages. Astor donated gifts totaling $20,000 to the German Society of the City of New York, during his term as president, from 1837 until 1841.

In the short story Bartleby, the Scrivener, Herman Melville used Astor as a symbol of men who made the earliest fortunes in New York.

The pair of marble lions that sit by the entrance of the New York Public Library Main Branch at Fifth Avenue and 42nd Street were originally named Leo Astor and Leo Lenox, after Astor and James Lenox, who founded the library from his own collection. Next, they were called Lord Astor and Lady Lenox (both lions are males). Mayor Fiorello La Guardia renamed them "Patience" and "Fortitude" during the Great Depression.

The neighborhood of Astoria in Queens, New York City, is named after Astor.

Astor Place in Manhattan, New York City, was named after Astor, soon after his death.

The coastal town of Astoria, Oregon, is named after Astor, as well as an elementary school named in his honor. The background to the founding of this town is described in Washington Irving's Astoria, a book whose writing was financed by Astor.

The historic neighborhood of Astor Park in Green Bay, Wisconsin, is named after Astor. In 1835, John Jacob Astor founded the Town of Astor in Wisconsin. After the Town of Astor was united with the Town of Navarino to form the Borough of Green Bay, one neighborhood was named after him.

A popular intersection in the inner city of Budapest is named after him, as well as the corresponding metro station, indirectly, through the Grand Budapest Astoria Hotel, which is located there.

In 1908, when the association football club FC Astoria Walldorf was formed in Astor's birthplace in Germany, the group added "Astoria" to its name in his, and the family's, honor.

== See also ==
- Russian-American Company
- Astor family
- Astoria (book)
- Astor Place
- Astor Row
- List of richest Americans in history
- List of Freemasons
- Waldorf-Astoria Hotel
- Joseph LaBarge – Steamboat captain hired by Astor and the American Fur Company, his primary shipper.

== Notes ==
Unknown	Richest man in the United States ?–1848	Succeeded by William Backhouse Astor Sr.
