= Don Vincente =

Fictional serial killer

Don Vincente, also known as Don Vicente and Fray Vicents, is a fictional character whose story was first published as an anonymous article in the French newspaper La Gazette des Tribunaux, in 1836. The legend was subsequently cited and reproduced as a true story in France and other countries through the 19th and early 20th centuries, while remaining virtually unknown in Spain. No historical evidence of Don Vincente or the criminal process against him has ever been found.

== The legend ==
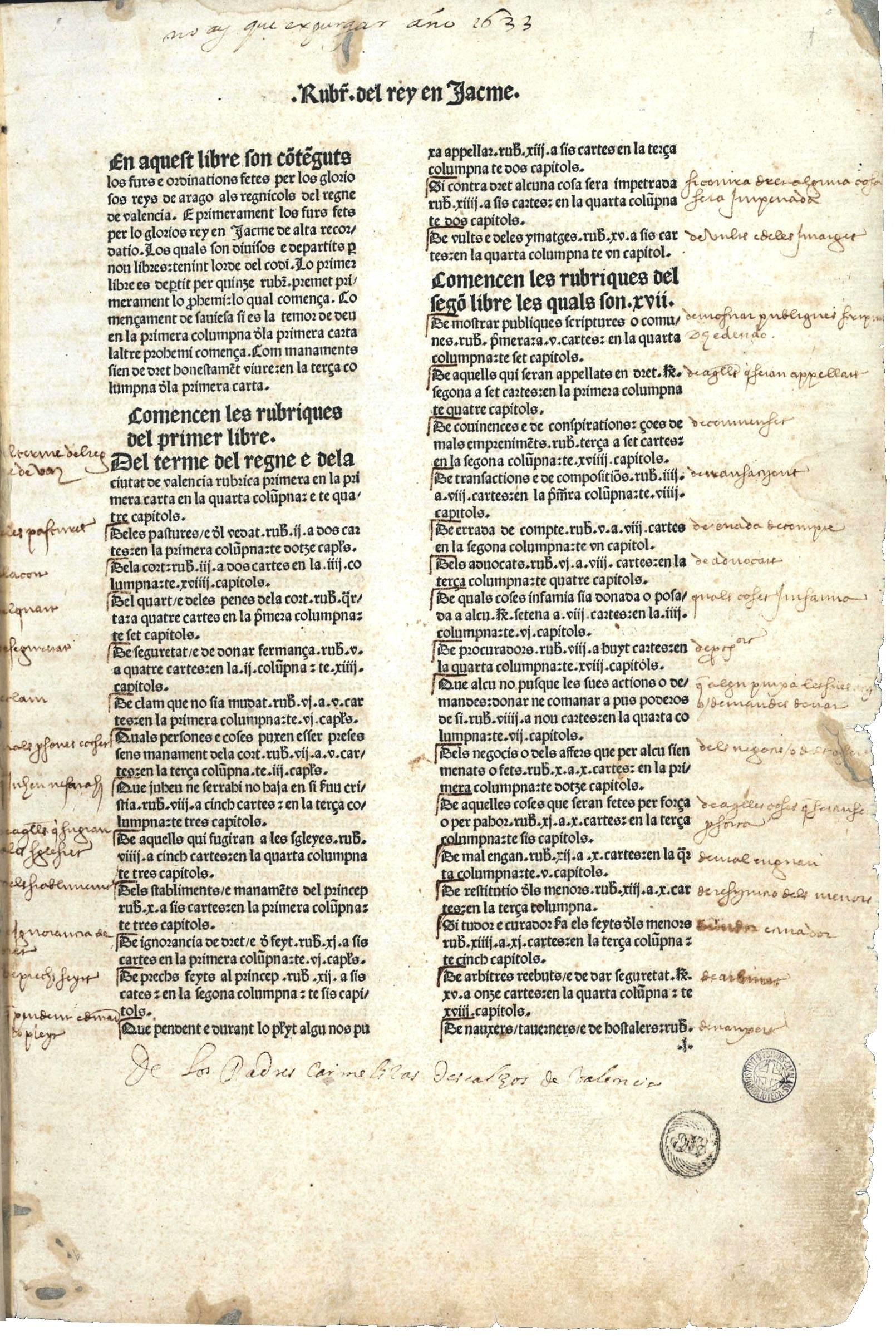
Frontpage of Furs de Valencia.

A "legendary biblio-criminal", Vincente's crimes are said to have begun when he was a monk at the Cistercian Poblet Monastery near Tarragona, where he worked as the librarian. In 1834, the monastery was robbed, with the loss of large amounts of gold and silver, along with rare books. Vincente was strongly suspected of helping the robbers in order to procure the books. He left the order shortly afterwards and moved to Barcelona, where he became the owner of a rare book store and was noted for appreciating his books to the point that "only [financial need] tempted him to sell them". Despite this, he was only known to enjoy looking at and owning the books, not reading them.

In 1836, a copy of Furs e Ordinations de Valencia ("Edicts and Ordinances for Valencia") by Lambert Palmart, Spain's first printer, came up for auction. Believed to be the only surviving copy of the book, a consortium of booksellers led by Augustino Patxot outbid Vincente to buy the copy. Three days later, Patxot's shop burned to the ground with him inside it. Initially assumed to be an accidental fire (Patxot was a smoker, and his body was found clutching his pipe), this theory was undermined as other bodies were discovered, nine in total, including a priest, a judge and an alderman. None were robbed, and there was no consistency in party membership that would point to it being a political dispute: the only thing the victims had in common was that they were "cultured men, dedicated to learning and reading".

Rumors began that Vincente was responsible for the deaths, and local officials searched his house to avoid giving the impression that they were neglecting the case. When they did so, they discovered a copy of the Ordinations. Further searches after he had been taken into custody revealed that many of the other books in his shop also belonged to the murdered men. Vincente initially claimed innocence, but finally confessed after the sheriff made clear that his books would be safe if he admitted it. In court, his lawyer argued that his client was insane, and that the presence of the Ordinations in his shop was circumstantial, as there was another copy in France. When he heard this, Vincente was horrified to discover his copy was not the only one, and continually muttered "my copy is not unique" until his execution.

== Origin and diffusion of the legend ==
The first version of the story was published in the number 3465 of the Parisian Gazette des Tribunaux, Journal de Jurisprudence et des débats judiciaires, Feuille d'Annonces légales, dated October 23, 1836. It was not signed and only attributed to an unnamed correspondent in Barcelona, Spain. In the opinion of Catalan bibliophile Ramon Miquel i Planas, who investigated the origins of the legend in the 1920s:

[I]t would be useless to look in the Barcelonese press of the time, or any other documented source, for any mention whatsoever of the supposed process against the monk in question and the subsequent execution of his sentence. Besides, however great the literary ability of the author of the story, and despite the lavish local color that he may have wanted to enrich it with, the falseness of the document is evident on plain sight to any connoisseur of our country and its customs; not that we may pretend to negate by this that the presumed correspondent had news quite precise and surely ocular of the scenario in which the events that he relates supposedly took place. But the same excess in picturesqueness betrays the artifice: the whole issue desprends the unmistakeable scent of what the Italians call a pasticcio,that is, a true literary swindle [...]. But, as nobody had taken upon themselves to investigate its origins until today, this famous invention of the murdering monk has been able to expand everywhere for over a hundred years, as if it was the most truthful of historical events.

A simplified version of the article from the Gazette was reproduced a few days later, on October 31, by the also Parisian sensationalist magazine Le Voleur, whose contents were entirely lifted from other publications (Le Voleur means "The Thief" in French). Either article could have inspired Gustave Flaubert, at the time a fifteen-year-old student in Rouen, to write a novelized version of Don Vincente's story titled Bibliomanie. Like most of Flaubert's youth stories, Bibliomanie remained unpublished until 1910, three decades after Flaubert's death. This second release, tied to a respectable literary name, reinvigorated the diffusion of the tale.

An English translation of the story had reached Australia by 1837.

In 1843, another shortened version of the article in the Gazette was reproduced in the German magazine Serapeum, published in Leipzig. This was submitted by the magazine's correspondent in Paris, L. A. Constantin, and was published in the original French. The only addition of Constantin was the date of Don Vincente's trial, now claimed to have happened on September 19, 1836. Miquel i Planas speculated that this date was chosen after subtracting the days necessary for a wagon to travel from Barcelona to Paris, to the date the article was first published in the Gazette. The legend was later retold in 1870 by French writer and critic Jules Janin in his book Le Livre, treating it as a true story. The first known Spanish mention of the legend is a letter from philologist Manuel Milà i Fontanals to his friend, the French hispanist Alfred Morel-Fatio, dated August 10, 1874. In this text and its subsequent reply, Milà called the story the "funniest thing ever seen" and Morel-Fatio criticized Janin for his "fantastic imagination". Milà lived in Barcelona and had been editor of the newspaper El Nuevo Vapor at the time that the execution of Don Vincente supposedly took place, yet this was the first time he had knowledge about what had supposedly been a local scandal. Yet another version of the story was included in the second volume of Miscellanées Bibliographiques, published in Paris in 1879. This was rewritten in its entirety by Prosper Blanchemain, who also treated the tale as a true story, although he named the article from the Gazette as his source.

The legend was not published in Spain until 1924, as a fictional tale in the series Cuentos de Bibliófilo ("Bibliophile Tales") published by the Institut Catalá de les Arts del Llibre at Barcelona. This version was a combination of Flaubert's and later versions, and was authored by Ramon Miquel i Planas, who thought, at the time, that Flaubert had been the originator of the story. Miquel i Planas also changed some names to make the story more accurate to the setting and added further references to unique books.

== See also ==
- List of serial killers before 1900

== Bibliography ==
- Miquel i Planas, Ramón (1991). El librero asesino de Barcelona. Editorial Montesinos. ISBN 8476391277.
- Basbanes, Nicholas A. (2012). A Gentle Madness: Bibliophiles, Bibliomanes, and the Eternal Passion for Books. Fine Book Press. ISBN 9780979949159.
- Sander, Max (1943). "Bibliomania". Journal of Criminal Law and Criminology. 34 (3). ISSN 0091-4169.
- Walsh, William S. (1893). Handy-Book of Literary Curiosities. J.B. Lippincott Co. OCLC 2192044.
