= Louis Geoffroy =

French writer

Louis-Napoléon Geoffroy-Château (1803–1858) was a French writer who penned one of the earliest works of alternate history. Aside from his writing, Geoffroy was a judge at the Seine Tribunal.

== Early life ==
Louis Geoffroy was born in 1803 under the rule of Napoleon I. His father, Marc-Antoine Geoffroy-Château, was an engineering officer and major who fought was awarded special distinction at Austerlitz and was killed at Augsburg in 1806, when his son was but three years old. He was then adopted by Napoleon.

The book which made Louis Geoffroy's reputation was Histoire de la Monarchie universelle: Napoléon et la conquête du monde (1812–1832) [Napoleon and the Conquest of the World] (1836; revised in 1841 as Napoléon Apocryphe). In it, Napoleon subdues Russia in 1812, invades England in 1814 and goes on to become the enlightened ruler of the Earth. The book details with great and methodical precision the conquest of the rest of the world by the Emperor, and the technical and scientific achievements made by a united planet under Napoleon's wise leadership: electric-powered dirigibles, weather control, flying automobiles, typewriters (called “writing pianos”), miracle cures, making sea water drinkable, and even the discovery of a new planet, Vulcan. The book was translated into English in 1994 as Napoleon and the Conquest of the World 1812-1832: A Fictional History, though copies of the translation are quite rare.

1836, when the book was published, was the year in which Louis-Napoléon Bonaparte - Napoleon I's nephew, the future Emperor Napoleon III - launched a failed coup attempt and had to flee into exile.

Louis Geoffroy lived to see the Bonapartist Empire restored and Napoleon III duly crowned.
