= Lizzie P. Evans-Hansell =

American novelist, short-story writer

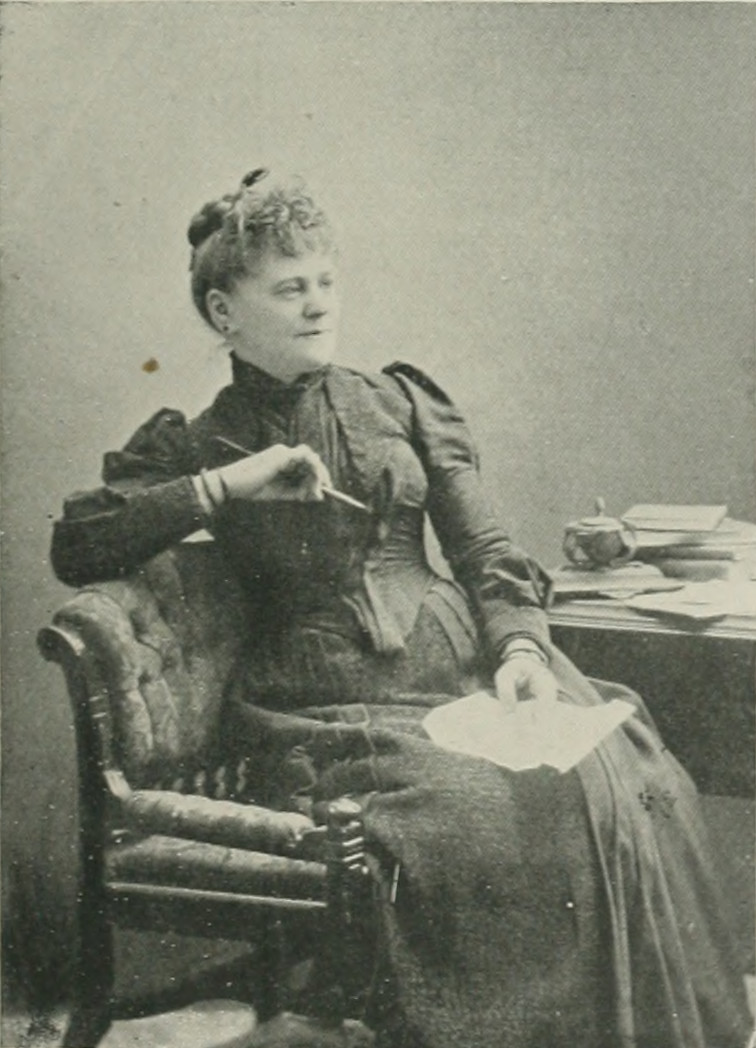
- Photo in A Woman of the Century
- Born: Eliza ("Lizzie") Phelps Estabrook; August 27, 1836; Arlington, Massachusetts, US
- Died: March 20, 1922 (aged 85); Arlington, Massachusetts, US
- Occupation: writer
- Spouses: Andrew Allison Evans (m. 1863); George Howe Hansell (m. 1893)
- Writing career
- Pen name: Esta Brook; Aunt Nabby; Mrs. Peleg Newsb;, Mrs. Abigail A. Evans
- Genres: novels; short stories

Signature
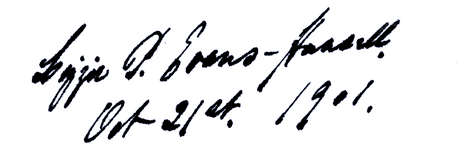

Eliza P. Evans-Hansell (née, Estabrook; pen names, Esta Brook, Aunt Nabby, Mrs. Peleg Newsby, Mrs. Abigail A. Evans; August 27, 1836 – March 20, 1922) was an American novelist and short-story writer from Massachusetts. Under the pen name of "Aunt Nabby", she wrote articles with dialect humor in the columns of the Boston Commonwealth and other newspapers, before aggregating the stories into an illustrated volume. Evans-Hansell was interested in historical and genealogical research.

== Early life and education ==
Eliza (nickname, "Lizzie") Phelps Estabrook was born in Arlington, Massachusetts, August 27, 1836 (or August 27, 1846). She was the youngest daughter of Captain Endor and Lydia Adams Estabrook, and a granddaughter of Deacon John Adams, who owned and occupied the Adams house, which was riddled with bullets when war swept through West Cambridge (now Arlington, Massachusetts), as the British soldiers, on their retreat from the battles of Lexington and Concord, erroneously supposed that the patriot, Samuel Adams, a cousin of "Deacon John", was secreted within its walls. Her siblings included: James Adams (1818-1866), Sarah Adams (b. 1820), Hannah Adams (b. 1822), Endor (1825-1880), John Norcross (b. 1830), Lydia A. (b. 1832), and Mary Emeline (b. 1834).

== Career ==
Under the book title of, Aunt Nabby, and using pseudonyms of "Mrs. Peleg Newsby" and "Mrs. Abigail A. Evans", Evans-Hansell collected the letters she wrote which appeared from time to time in the columns of the Boston Commonwealth and other newspapers into an illustrated volume. The diction and humor of these missives served as an effective medium for the satire and comment upon measures and people for which "Aunt Nabby" was distinguished. "Aunt Nabby" was an entertaining picture of country life, customs, dialects and ideas. The book was a successful essay in laughing down the overdone conventionalities of fashionable life.

Another of her successful books was From Summer to Summer, an entertaining home story. She also wrote many short stories and sketches, published under the pen name "Esta Brook" (or "Esta Brooks"). Her articles of dialect humor were written under the pen name of "Aunt Nabby".

== Personal life ==
On November 3, 1863, she married Andrew Allison Evans (Concord, New Hampshire, September 5, 1816 - Boston, May 31, 1888), son of Samuel and Margaret Barr (Allison) Evans. The inventor of the all-paper collar, he actively endorsed the temperance cause. She resided in Somerville, Massachusetts, and was interested in historical and genealogical research.

On August 16, 1893, in New York, she married George Howe Hansell.

Lizzie P. Evans-Hansell died in Arlingtohn, Massachusetts, March 20, 1922.

== Selected works ==
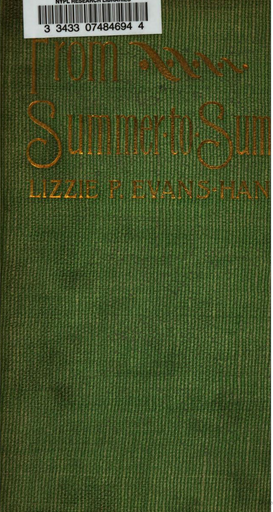

- Aunt Nabby: her rambles, her adventures, and her notions, 1898
- From Summer to Summer: A Novel, 1901
