= Astoria (book) =

Non-fiction book by Washington Irving in 1836

Astoria: Or, Enterprise Beyond the Rocky Mountains is a book published in 1836 by Washington Irving.

== Historical background ==
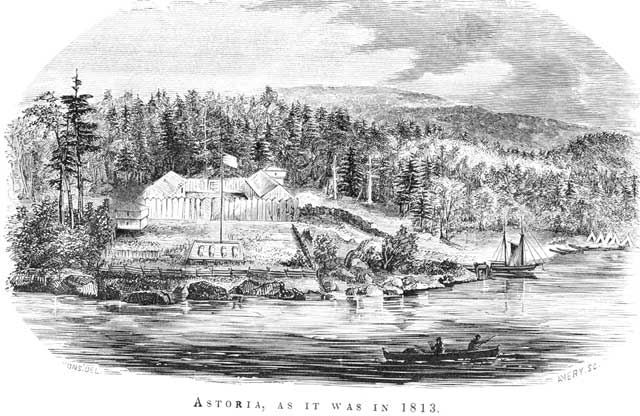
Gabriel Franchère's 1813 sketch of Fort Astoria

The book describes an expedition to the mouth of the Columbia River and the ultimate failure of attempts in the early 19th century to establish a permanent American-controlled commercial base at Astoria. The 1810–1813 expedition was financed by the New York business man, John Jacob Astor, with a view to establishing a trading post for his Pacific Fur Company, in competition with British and, to a lesser extent, Russian interests in the region. As described in Astoria, the expedition involved a sea journey by the ship, Tonquin, as well as overland journeys that blazed what would ultimately become the Oregon Trail.

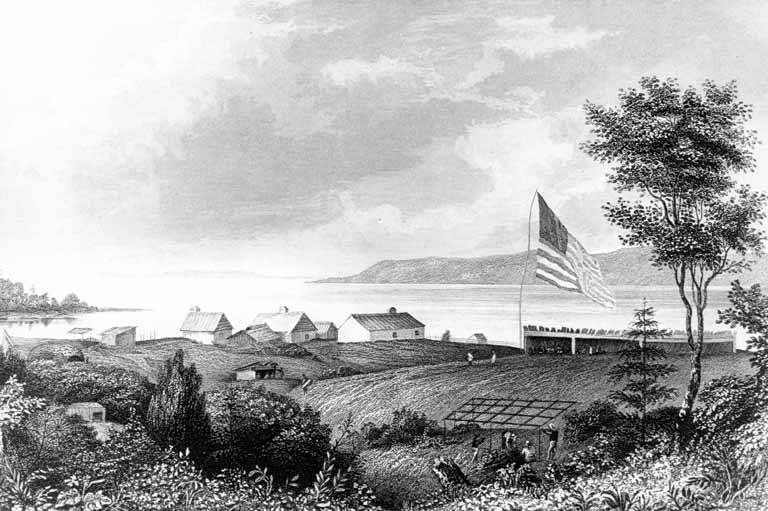
Fort Astoria, 1811-1813

The War of 1812 broke out during the attempts to make the outpost at Astoria viable. Because of direct military threats from the British, along with other problems described in the book (conflicts with indigenous peoples, managerial shortcomings and the difficulties of communication across such long distances), the project ultimately failed. All of its assets were sold to the rival North West Company in 1813. As Irving documents, the expeditions took a heavy toll, with some 60 men losing their lives on land or at sea.

== Writing ==
In 1834, John Jacob Astor commissioned Washington Irving – at that time one of the best-known American authors – to write the book as an official history of his company's Astor Expedition to Oregon. The proposal was a continuation of a long-standing relationship between the two men that lasted until Astor's death in 1848.

Irving accepted Astor's offer, but insisted on maintaining editorial control over the book's contents. In a letter to his nephew, Irving described his vision for Astoria as "not merely a history of his [Astor's] great colonial and commercial enterprise, and of the fortunes of his colony, but a body of information concerning the whole region beyond the Rocky Mountains, on the borders of the Columbia River, comprising the adventures, by sea and land, of traders, trappers, Indian warriors, hunters, etc their habits, characters, persons, costumes, etc; description of natural scenery, animals, plants etc. etc. ..."

Irving relied on a variety of sources as background for the book. Astor had organised his papers on the Astoria expeditions and settlement and made them available to Irving. Irving also employed his nephew, Pierre Munro Irving, for 2 years to do extensive background research. Other sources used were from the United States Superintendent of Indian Trade during the 1820s, the Lewis and Clark journals as well as the journals of traders Ross Cox and Gabriel Franchère and of the explorer Steven Long.

Irving took only a few months to complete the book, once all the material had been gathered and organized. Astor hosted Irving and his nephew for several months at his country estate in Hellgate, New York. In a letter to his brother, Irving attributed his rapid completion of the book to this ideal setting: "I cannot tell you how sweet and delightful I have found this retreat; pure air, agreeable scenery, a spacious house, profound quiet, and perfect command of my time and self. The consequence is that I have written more since I have been here than I have ever done in the same space of time".

== Publication and reception ==
Irving completed Astoria in late 1835. The book was published in October 1836 by Bentley in London and by Carey and Lea in Philadelphia. In the absence of international copyright protections, one purpose of the simultaneous publication in England and the United States was to establish copyright in the two markets.

Astoria became an immediate bestseller. It was translated into Dutch, French and German and went into 25 reprints prior to Irving's death in 1859. For a time, it was required reading in some schools.

== Accuracy ==
Numerous attempts have been made to ascertain the degree to which Astoria is a work of fiction and to what extent it is historically and geographically accurate. Others have sought to trace out the modern equivalents of the routes taken by the various parties that participated in the expedition. Some historians have raised questions about the authenticity of Irving's account.

Irving's book itself contains little in the way of footnotes and annotations that might be used to provide answers to these questions. Furthermore, the documentation provided to Irving by Astor (contained in fifteen or more packing cases) was, for the most part, destroyed decades after Astor's death.

Despite these obstacles, subsequent research has been able to broadly confirm the historical and geographical accuracy of Astoria. For example, an analysis of the sources of Irving's account of the destruction of the ship, Tonquin, and of his revision of this account shows that "he combined a responsible attitude toward the writing of history with the rare gifts of smooth, economical narration and vivid pictorial skill that had already won him fame." An early 20th century reconstruction of the expedition's land routes—including by using the book as a guide to 'follow in the footsteps of one of the expedition's parties—found precise locations for nearly all of the major events described and provided evidence of the "historical value of the work as a history." Thus, there is significant support for the view that Astoria can be read both as "good literature and good history."

For detailed annotations relevant to the accuracy of Irving's work, see the Edgeley W. Todd edition.
