= Pran of Albania =

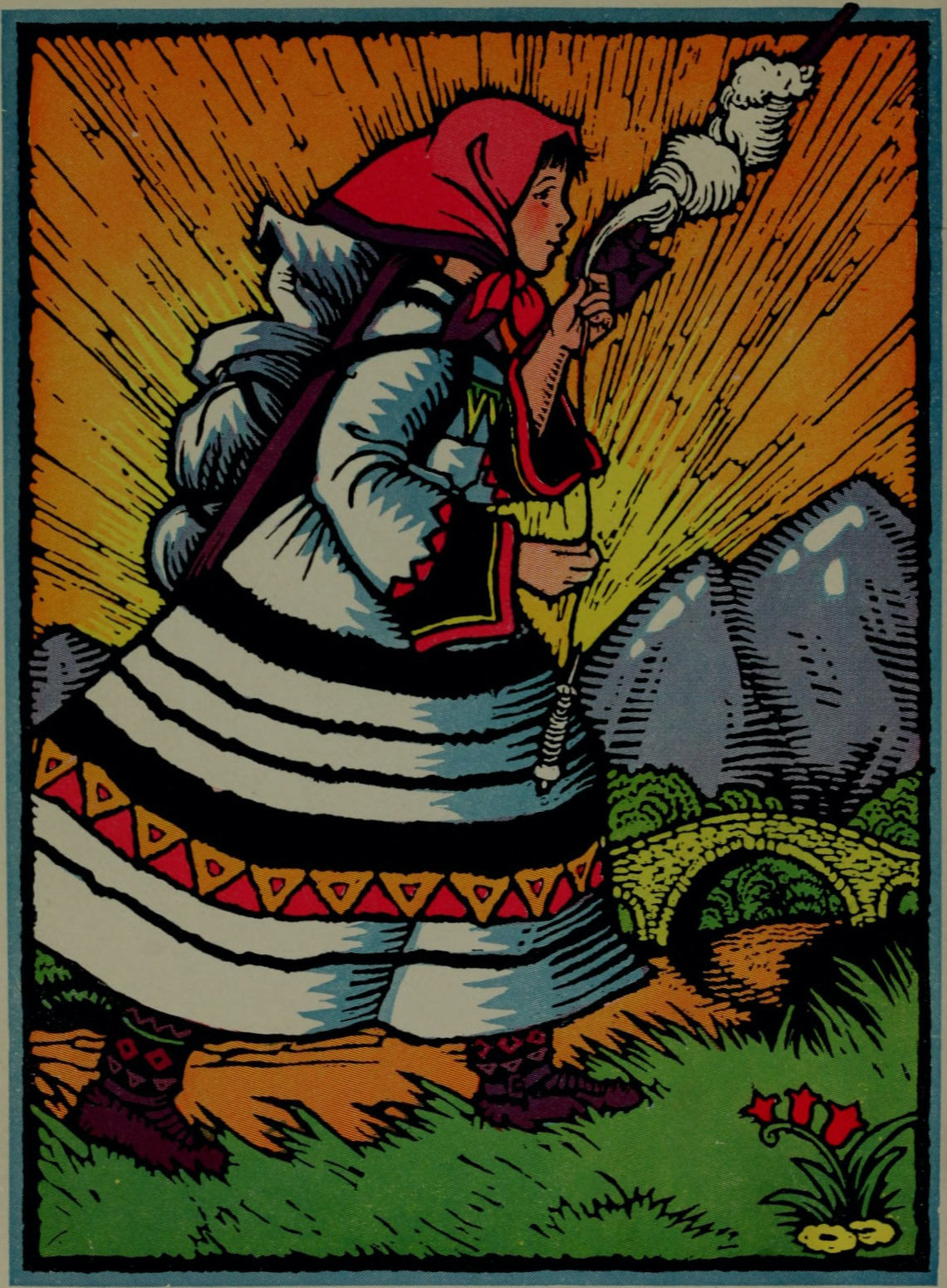
- First edition frontispiece
- Author: Elizabeth Miller
- Illustrator: Maud and Miska Petersham
- Language: English
- Genre: Children's literature
- Publication date: 1929
- Publication place: United States

Pran of Albania is a 1929 children's historical novel written by Elizabeth Miller and illustrated by Maud and Miska Petersham. Set in the early nineteenth century among the mountain tribes of northern Albania, it tells the story of a young girl, Pran, in the prelude to World War I. Miller was inspired by her time in the Red Cross during the closing months of WWI. The novel was a Newbery Honor recipient in 1930.

== Summary ==
14-year-old Pran lives with her family in the mountains of Albania. While out collecting firewood, she encounters Nush, a young man, who later saves Pran's brother Nik from drowning in a river. After an attack by Slavs, Pran and her family flee to Skodra. Pran helps deliver supplies to her father on the front lines of the battle, then returns to find she has been betrothed. Not knowing her suitor, Pran takes a vow to avoid the arranged marriage, becoming a sworn virgin. Later at a tribal council meeting, Pran calls for a truce to end the feuds between the rival families. Nush, a member of a feuding family, is now free to declare his love for Nush, to whom her father had betrothed her. Pran and Nush are then married.
