= The Story of Mankind (film) =

1957 film by Irwin Allen

- 1957 U.S. theatrical poster
- Directed by: Irwin Allen
- Screenplay by: Irwin Allen; Charles Bennett
- Based on: The Story of Mankind; 1921 novel by Hendrik Willem van Loon
- Produced by: Irwin Allen; George E. Swink
- Starring: Ronald Colman; Vincent Price; Hedy Lamarr
- Cinematography: Nicholas Musuraca
- Edited by: Roland Gross; Gene Palmer
- Music by: Paul Sawtell
- Production company: Cambridge Productions
- Distributed by: Warner Bros. Pictures, Inc.
- Release date: November 8, 1957
- Running time: 100 minutes
- Country: United States
- Language: English

The Story of Mankind is a 1957 American fantasy film, loosely based on the nonfiction book The Story of Mankind (1921) by Hendrik Willem van Loon. The film was directed and coproduced by Irwin Allen and released by Warner Bros. Pictures.

== Premise ==
In the film, the fate of humanity is decided in a court of law. The Devil is the prosecutor, and the Spirit of Man acts as the defense lawyer. Historical figures and eras are used as evidence for and against humanity's right to salvation. The judge cannot decide due to the fine balance between humanity's good and evil. So humanity is going to continue its struggle with itself.

== Plot ==
Scientists have developed a weapon called the Super H-bomb that can exterminate the human race. A high tribunal in the Great Court of Outer Space is convened to decide whether divine intervention should be allowed to stop the bomb's detonation. The devil, who goes by the name of Mr. Scratch, prosecutes humankind while the Spirit of Man defends it.

Scratch and the Spirit of Man are allowed to take the tribunal to any period of time to present evidence for humankind's salvation or damnation. They take the tribunal from prehistory through Egyptian, Greco-Roman, Medieval, Renaissance, Enlightenment and modern times, looking at historical figures.

Ultimately the tribunal is asked to rule. The high judge, facing Mr. Scratch and the Spirit with a large assemblage of peoples in their native costumes behind them, declares that the good and evil of humankind are too finely balanced. A decision is suspended until they return. When they return, they expect to see a resolution of humanity's age-old struggle with itself.

== Cast ==
- Ronald Colman as The Spirit of Man
- Vincent Price as Mr. Scratch
- Hedy Lamarr as Joan of Arc
- Groucho Marx as Peter Minuit
- Harpo Marx as Sir Isaac Newton
- Chico Marx as Monk
- Virginia Mayo as Cleopatra
- Agnes Moorehead as Queen Elizabeth I
- Peter Lorre as Nero
- Charles Coburn as Hippocrates
- Sir Cedric Hardwicke as High Judge
- Cesar Romero as Spanish Envoy
- John Carradine as Khufu
- Dennis Hopper as Napoleon Bonaparte
- Marie Wilson as Marie Antoinette
- Helmut Dantine as Mark Antony
- Edward Everett Horton as Sir Walter Raleigh
- Reginald Gardiner as William Shakespeare
- Marie Windsor as Joséphine de Beauharnais
- George E. Stone as Waiter
- Cathy O'Donnell as Early Christian Woman
- Franklin Pangborn as Marquis de Varennes
- Melville Cooper as Major Domo
- Henry Daniell as Bishop Cauchon
- Francis X. Bushman as Moses
- Jim Ameche as Alexander Graham Bell
- Bobby Watson as Adolf Hitler
- Austin Green as Abraham Lincoln

== Production ==
The film was former publicist Irwin Allen's first attempt at directing live actors after his award-winning documentaries The Sea Around Us and The Animal World. In May 1955, Allen announced he would write, produce and direct a film based on the book, and Warner Bros. Pictures agreed to distribute the film. Jack Warner announced that 42 nations would be represented. Allen said securing the rights was "very complicated."

In March 1956, Allen said the film had been in preproduction for a year and that filming would start in June. The original intention was for only two actors to appear in the film, a man and a woman representing humankind through the ages. The film would take over two years to shoot in 18 countries, and Warner Bros. invited several prominent theologians, historians and philosophers to an advisory board for the production. This plan was soon jettisoned. Allen finished a script with Charles Bennett by August 1956.

=== Casting ===
Allen wanted an all-star cast to play various people in history. This casting strategy had recently proved very popular in Around the World in 80 Days.

"Where we can't do justice to a time and place we won't just brush them off summarily," said Allen, "We just won't use them. There have been 400 or more giants of history in all our fields. Our big problem has been to bring them down to about 50, asking about each: was what he or she did lasting - and how long did it last? Telling history on the screen can be like telling a bad joke twice. You first have to find a handle, a gimmick."

The first four names cast were Vincent Price, Cedric Hardwicke, Diana Lynn (as Joan of Arc) and Peter Lorre. Next were Ronald Colman, Yvonne de Carlo (as Cleopatra), Charles Coburn and Hedy Lamarr, who replaced Lynn as Joan of Arc. Groucho Marx and Cesar Romero joined. Virginia Mayo would eventually replace de Carlo.

Screenwriter Charles Bennett recalled that Allen paid each of the stars $2,000, though Greer Garson turned down the role of Queen Elizabeth I.

=== Shooting ===
Filming started on November 12, 1956. As with Allen's two previous films, The Story of Mankind features vast amounts of stock footage. Battle and action scenes culled from previous Warner Bros. costume films (such as Howard Hawks' 1955 epic Land of the Pharaohs) were coupled with cheaply shot closeups of actors on much smaller sets.

This was the last film to feature the three Marx Brothers, Groucho Marx, Harpo Marx and Chico Marx (and their only film in Technicolor), although they appear in separate scenes and do not act together. Chico became ill and later died on October 11, 1961. This was also the last film of star Ronald Colman and character actor Franklin Pangborn, and the last American film of Hedy Lamarr.

== Reception and legacy ==
According to The New York Times, The Story of Mankind was "a protracted and tedious lesson in history that is lacking in punch, sophistication and a consistent point of view." The film was listed in the 1978 book The Fifty Worst Films of All Time.

== Home media ==
Warner Home Video released the film as part of its Warner Archive made-to-order DVD line on July 20, 2009, in the United States.

== Comic book adaptation ==
- Dell Four Color #851 (January 1958)

== See also ==
- List of American films of 1957
- The Tragedy of Man, a Hungarian play from 1861 with a similar premise
