= The Story of Mankind =

1921 book by Hendrik Willem van Loon

- Author: Hendrik Willem van Loon
- Illustrator: Hendrik Willem van Loon
- Language: English
- Genre: Children's literature
- Publisher: H. Liveright
- Publication date: 1921
- Publication place: United States
- Media type: Print (Hardback & Paperback)
- Pages: 529 pp (hardback); 280 pp (paperback)

The Story of Mankind is a book written and illustrated by Dutch-American journalist, professor, and author Hendrik Willem van Loon. It was published in 1921. In 1922, it was awarded the Newbery Medal for an outstanding contribution to children's literature. This was the first year the Newbery Medal was awarded.

Written for Van Loon's children, The Story of Mankind tells in brief chapters the history of Western civilization, beginning with primitive man, covering the development of writing, art, and architecture, the rise of major religions, and the formation of the modern nation-state. Van Loon explains in the book how he selected what and what not to include by subjecting all materials to the question "Did the person or event in question perform an act without which the entire history of civilization would have been different?".

Van Loon published an updated edition in 1926 which included an extra essay, "After Seven Years", about the effects of World War I and another update in 1938 with a new epilogue. Since Van Loon's death in 1944, extensive additions were included in The Story of Mankind, initially by van Loon's son, Gerrit van Loon. The 2014 version (ISBN 978-0-87140-865-5) by Robert Sullivan covers events up to the early 2010s.

== Adaptation ==
In 1957, a feature film with the same title was released, based on the book. It stars Ronald Colman and an all-star cast, featuring, among others, the Marx Brothers.

Awards
Preceded by (none)	Newbery Medal recipient 1922	Succeeded by The Voyages of Doctor Dolittle
