= John Stuart Thomson =

American poet

John Stuart Thomson (1869–1950) was a writer from the United States. He wrote the books China Revolutionized, The Chinese, Bud and Bamboo, and Fil and Filippa: Story of Child Life in the Philippines.

== Works ==
- Estabelle and Other Verses (1897)
- Henry Wadsworth Longfellow (1897)
- Eulaline (1899)
- A Day's Song (1900)
- Thomson, John Stuart (1909). The Chinese. Bobbs-Merrill Company.
- The Opium Crusade in China (1909)
- China Revolutionized (1913)
- Fil and Filippa: Story of Child Life in the Philippines (1917)
- Business men! Be publicists! (1919)
- Retention of Philippines (1920)
- Bud and Bamboo (c. 1923)
- Alliance with Japan (1918)

== See also ==
- Thomasites
