= SS Hendrik Willem Van Loon =

Liberty ship of WWII

History

United States
- Name: Hendrik Willem Van Loon
- Namesake: Hendrik Willem Van Loon
- Owner: War Shipping Administration (WSA)
- Operator: United States Lines
- Ordered: as type (EC2-S-C1) hull, MC hull 2482
- Awarded: 23 April 1943
- Builder: St. Johns River Shipbuilding Company, Jacksonville, Florida
- Cost: $1,180,861
- Yard number: 46
- Way number: 4
- Laid down: 5 May 1944
- Launched: 14 June 1944
- Sponsored by: Eliza Helen van Loon
- Completed: 2 July 1944
- Identification: Call sign: WQFP
- Fate: Laid up in the National Defense Reserve Fleet, Astoria, Oregon, 15 May 1947; Sold for scrapping, 19 April 1965

General characteristics
- Class & type: Liberty ship; type EC2-S-C1, standard
- Tonnage: 10,865 LT DWT; 7,176 GRT
- Displacement: 3,380 long tons (3,434 t) (light); 14,245 long tons (14,474 t) (max)
- Length: 441 feet 6 inches (135 m) oa; 416 feet (127 m) pp; 427 feet (130 m) lwl
- Beam: 57 feet (17 m)
- Draft: 27 ft 9.25 in (8.4646 m)
- Installed power: 2 × Oil fired 450 °F (232 °C) boilers, operating at 220 psi (1,500 kPa); 2,500 hp (1,900 kW)
- Propulsion: 1 × triple-expansion steam engine, (manufactured by Joshua Hendy Iron Works, Sunnyvale, California); 1 × screw propeller
- Speed: 11.5 knots (21.3 km/h; 13.2 mph)
- Capacity: 562,608 cubic feet (15,931 m^{3}) (grain); 499,573 cubic feet (14,146 m^{3}) (bale)
- Complement: 38–62 USMM; 21–40 USNAG
- Armament: Varied by ship; Bow-mounted 3-inch (76 mm)/50-caliber gun; Stern-mounted 4-inch (102 mm)/50-caliber gun; 2–8 × single 20-millimeter (0.79 in) Oerlikon anti-aircraft (AA) cannons and/or, 2–8 × 37-millimeter (1.46 in) M1 AA guns

SS Hendrik Willem Van Loon was a liberty ship built in the United States during World War II. She was named after Hendrik Willem Van Loon, a Dutch-American historian, journalist, and children's book author.

== Construction ==
Hendrik Willem Van Loon was laid down on 5 May 1944, under a Maritime Commission (MARCOM) contract, MC hull 2482, by the St. Johns River Shipbuilding Company, Jacksonville, Florida; sponsored by Eliza Helen van Loon, the widow of the namesake, and was launched on 14 June 1944.

== History ==
She was allocated to the United States Lines, on 2 July 1944. On 15 May 1947, she was laid up in the National Defense Reserve Fleet, Astoria, Oregon. On 1 July 1954, she was withdrawn from the fleet to be loaded with grain under the "Grain Program 1954", she returned loaded on 15 July 1954. On 8 October 1956, she was withdrawn to be unload, she returned on empty 12 October 1956. She was sold for scrapping, 19 April 1965, to Zidell Explorations, Inc., for $46,111.64. She was removed from the fleet on 21 May 1965.

== Bibliography ==
- "St. John's River Shipbuilding, Jacksonville FL". www.ShipbuildingHistory.com. 16 October 2010.
- Maritime Administration. "Hendrik Willem Van Loon". Ship History Database Vessel Status Card. U.S. Department of Transportation, Maritime Administration.
- Davies, James (May 2004). "Specifications (As-Built)" (PDF). p. 23.
- "SS Hendrik Willem Van Loon".
