= Van Loon's Lives =

1942 book by Hendrik Willem van Loon

First edition (publ. Simon & Schuster)

Van Loon's Lives is a book by the Dutch-American writer Hendrik Willem van Loon published in 1942. Its full title, deliberately written in a manner already archaic at the time of writing, is Van Loon's Lives: Being a true and faithful account of a number of highly interesting meetings with certain historical personages, from Confucius and Plato to Voltaire and Thomas Jefferson, about whom we had always felt a great deal of curiosity and who came to us as dinner guests in a bygone year.

Loosely based on the classical Plutarch's Lives, it recounts the biographies of various famous historical characters, and like Plutarch often pairing together characters from different times and places whose life, careers or personalities seemed to Van Loon to bear a similarity to each other (e.g. William the Silent and George Washington who led the Wars of Independence of their respective countries; the philosophers Descartes and Emerson; Empress Theodora of Byzantium and Queen Elizabeth I of England; Torquemada and Robespierre, of both of whom Van Loon had less than a flattering view...).

In the book the author imagines he is living in his summer home in the town of Veere on the island of Walcheren in the Dutch province of Zealand. He has the ability to summon the famous (and sometimes infamous) great men and women of history to come to dinner. The summoning is done in the prosaic way of leaving under a specific stone a note with the names of the persons they wish to meet that weekend, who duly make their appearance. This magical aspect places the book within the category of contemporary fantasy, though the term did not yet exist at the time it was published.

Chapters in the book typically start with Van Loon describing the lives of the people invited that week, with many digressions and idiosyncratic comments, opinions and comparisons with actual 20th century events - particularly with the doings of Hitler and Nazi Germany in general and the Nazi occupation of the Netherlands in particular, which was clearly very much on Van Loon's mind. This is followed by these people appearing in the 1930s provincial Netherlands and their interaction with modern people, in some cases consisting of polite and intellectually stimulating conversations, in other cases leading to humorous or hilarious results. (For example, the Archbishop of Bithynia and Archbishop of Cyrenaica, who were staunch theological foes during the 4th century Council of Nicea, wildly assault each other as soon as they are resurrected in the 20th century and run out into the streets of Veere, shouting abuse. A local policeman locks them up in separate cells, but by the next morning they have mysteriously disappeared...)

The book was written at the time when Veere, like the rest of the Netherlands, lay under Nazi occupation. Despite its light-hearted tone, the book clearly indicates the longing of the writer for his homeland whose liberation he was doomed never to see, having died in 1944. This is especially indicated in the book's dedication to the exiled Queen Juliana. Also, the book's plot is set in the late 1930s with the clouds of impending war clearly visible, and in its end the protagonists must flee the German invasion, bringing to an end their meetings with the people from the past.
