= Fil and Filippa: Story of Child Life in the Philippines =

Book by John Stuart Thomson

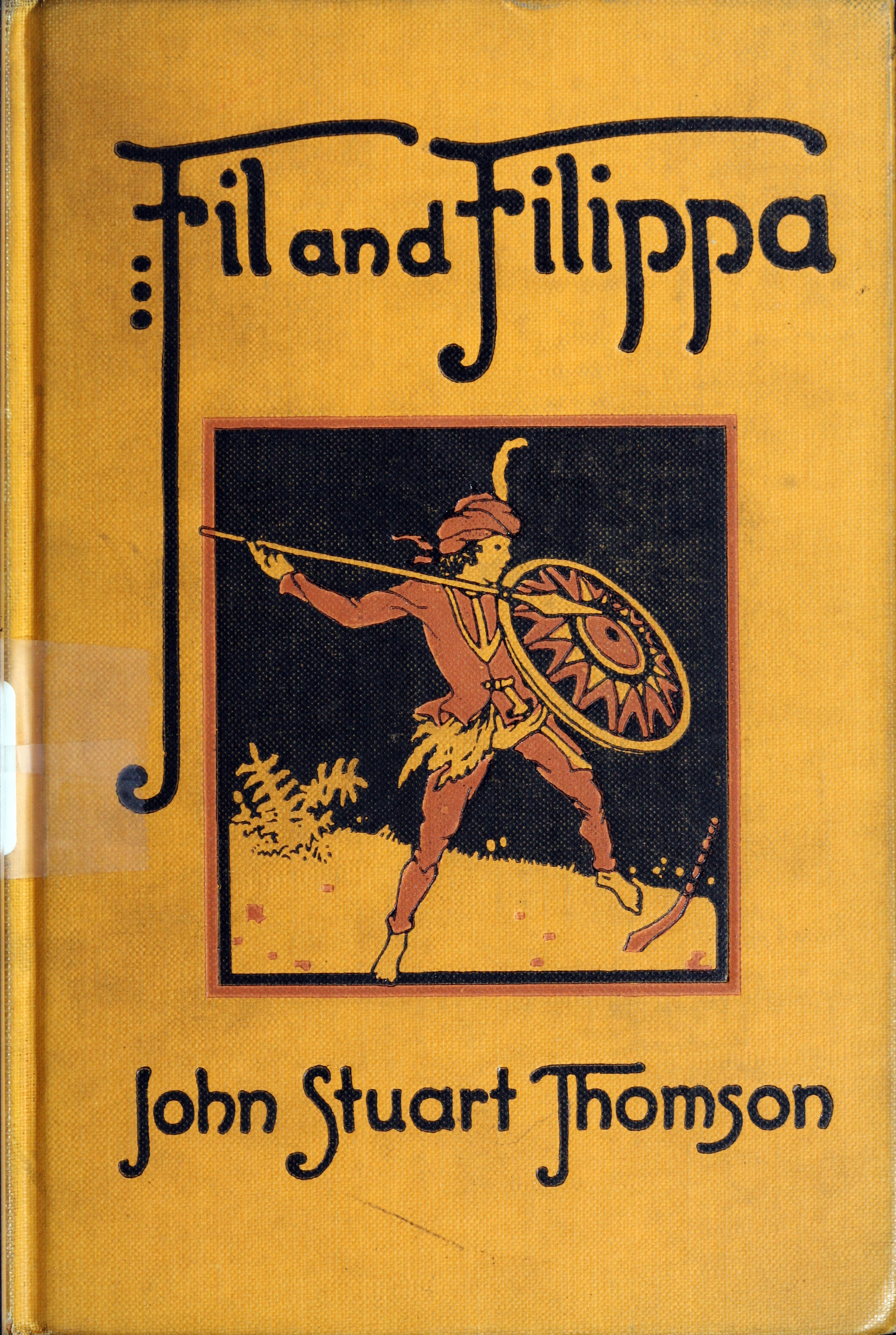
- The bookcover of Fil and Filippa: Story of Child Life in the Philippines by John Stuart Thomson.
- Author: John Stuart Thomson
- Illustrator: Maud and Miska Petersham
- Language: English
- Genre: Historical, cultural, and children's novel
- Publisher: Macmillan Company
- Publication date: 1917
- Publication place: United States
- Media type: Print (Hardback)
- Pages: 75
- ISBN: 1-4325-9733-7

Fil and Filippa: Story of Child Life in the Philippines is a 1917 novel written by American writer John Stuart Thomson. In the novel, Thomson narrated the life in the Philippines based on his impression of the country as a first time visitor. He focused on the customs and the life at home of a Filipino child. The story was written for children at the fifth, sixth, and seventh grade levels in the United States. The illustrations for the book were drawn by husband and wife illustrators Maud and Miska Petersham.

== Description ==
The historical and cultural novel begins with Thomson as the narrator who had just arrived in the Philippines. He met two children, namely Fil and Filippa. With the children, Thomson had a discussion about the history of the Philippines, including how the archipelago was named.

During the interactive discussion, Thomson was able to differentiate the United States from the Philippines. He described the Philippines as a group of islands that were rich in natural resources, culture, and traditions. He described the Philippines as "a string of pearls hanging from the golden Equator.”

The book was written by Thomson during the American occupation of the Philippines. It was published in New York City in the United States by the Macmillan Company. It is composed of nineteen chapters.

== Characters ==
The main characters in the novel include Fil, a Filipino boy; Filippa, Fil's sister; Favra, Filippa's playmate; Moro, the Mohammedan, Fil's playmate; the father and mother of Fil and Filippa; the Padre, a priest; a guest; and the driver of a water buffalo cart.
