= Chava Rosenfarb =

Yiddish writer and Holocaust survivor (1923–2011)

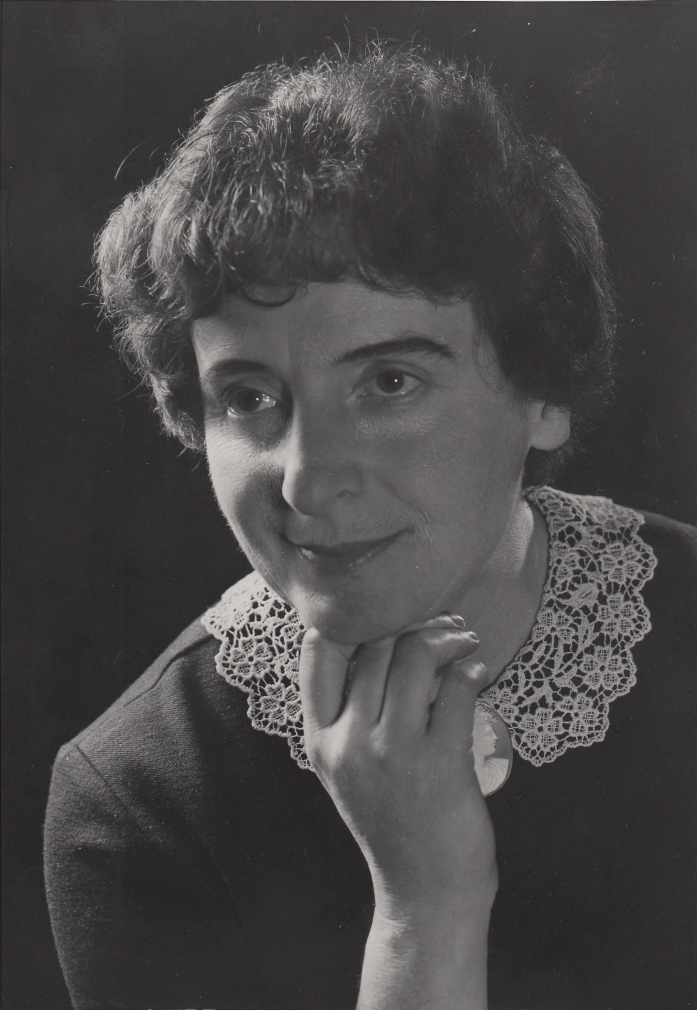
- Born: February 9, 1923; Łódź, Poland
- Died: January 30, 2011 (aged 87); Lethbridge, Alberta, Canada
- Occupations: Author, poet
- Spouse: Henry Morgentaler (m. 1945–1975)
- Children: Goldie Morgentaler

Chava Rosenfarb (9 February 1923 – 30 January 2011) (Yiddish: חוה ראָזענפֿאַרב, khave rozenfarb) was a Holocaust survivor and Jewish-Canadian author of Yiddish poetry and novels, a major contributor to post-World War II Yiddish literature.

== Early life ==
Rosenfarb began writing poetry at the age of eight. After surviving the Łódź Ghetto during the occupation of Poland by Nazi Germany, Rosenfarb was deported to Auschwitz, and then sent with other women to a work camp at Sasel (subcamp of Neuengamme concentration camp), where she built houses for the bombed-out Germans of Hamburg. Towards the end of the war she was sent to Bergen-Belsen, where she fell ill with nearly-fatal typhus fever in April 1945. After the end of the war, while still in Europe, Rosenfarb married the future nationally famous Canadian abortion activist Dr. Henry Morgentaler (the two divorced in 1975). In 1950, she and Morgentaler emigrated to Canada. Morgentaler and Rosenfarb, pregnant with Goldie, their daughter, landed in Montreal in the winter of 1950, to a reception of Yiddish writers at Windsor Station.

== Career ==
Rosenfarb continued to write in Yiddish. She published three volumes of poetry between 1947 and 1965. In 1972, she published what is considered to be her masterpiece, Der boim fun lebn (דער בוים פֿון לעבן), a three-volume novel detailing her experiences in the Łódź Ghetto, which appeared in English translation as The Tree of Life. Her other novels are Botshani (באָטשאַני), a prequel to The Tree of Life, which was issued in English as two volumes, Bociany (meaning Storks in the Polish language) and Of Lodz and Love; and Briv tsu Abrashen (בריוו צו אַבראַשען), or Letters to Abrasha (not yet translated).

For years, Rosenfarb exchanged letters with her childhood friend and fellow Holocaust survivor Zenia Larsson, who published her side of the correspondence in a collection entitled Brev Fran En Ny Verk Lighet (1972).

Rosenfarb's readership decreased as the secular Yiddish culture in the Americas began to erode and assimilate, so she turned to translation. She was a regular contributor to the Yiddish literary journal Di Goldene Keyt (די גאָלדענע קייט) – meaning, roughly translated, "The Golden Chain (of Generations)" – edited in Tel Aviv by the poet and Vilna Ghetto survivor Abraham Sutzkever, until it closed. A collection of her stories in English translation, Survivors: Seven Short Stories, was published in 2004. A play, The Bird of the Ghetto, was performed in Hebrew translation in Israel by Israel's national theatre, Habimah, in 1966 and in English translation in Toronto by Threshold Theatre in 2012. A selection of her poetry was published in English in 2013 as Exile at Last. Most of the poems were translated by Rosenfarb herself.

== Death ==
She died on 30 January 2011 in Lethbridge, Alberta. Her daughter, Goldie Morgentaler, is a professor of English literature at the University of Lethbridge as well as a prominent literary translator into English of her mother's work. Her son Abraham is a doctor in Boston and the author of several books on urology and men's health.

== Honours and awards ==
Rosenfarb was the recipient of numerous international literary prizes, including the Itzik Manger Prize, Israel's highest award for Yiddish literature, as well as a Canadian Jewish Book Award and the John Glassco Prize for Literary Translation. She was awarded an honorary degree by the University of Lethbridge in 2006.

== Major publications ==
Cover of Exile at Last (2013)

- Di balade fun nekhtikn vald די באַלאַדע פֿון נעכטיקן וואַלד [The ballad of yesterday's forest] (London, 1947)
- Dos lid fun dem yidishn kelner Abram דאָס ליד פֿון דעם ייִדישן קעלנער אַבראַם [The song of the Jewish waiter Abram]
- Geto un andere lider געטאָ און אַנדערע לידער [Ghetto and other poems]
- Aroys fun gan-eydn אַרויס פֿון גן־עדן [Out of Paradise]
- Der foigl fun geto ָדער פֿויגל פֿון געטא [The Bird of the Ghetto] (1966)
- Der boim fun lebn (1972) [trans. into English as The Tree of Life (University of Wisconsin Press, 2004)]
- Letters to Abrash. The Montreal Gazette, May 7, 1995 (Briv tsu abrashen. Tel-Aviv, I. L. Peretz Publ. House, 1992)
- Bociany באָטשאַני (Syracuse University Press, 2000)
- Of Lodz and Love (Syracuse University Press, 2000)
- Survivors: Seven Short Stories (Cormorant Books, 2005)
