= Hendrik Willem van Loon =

Dutch-American historian, journalist and author

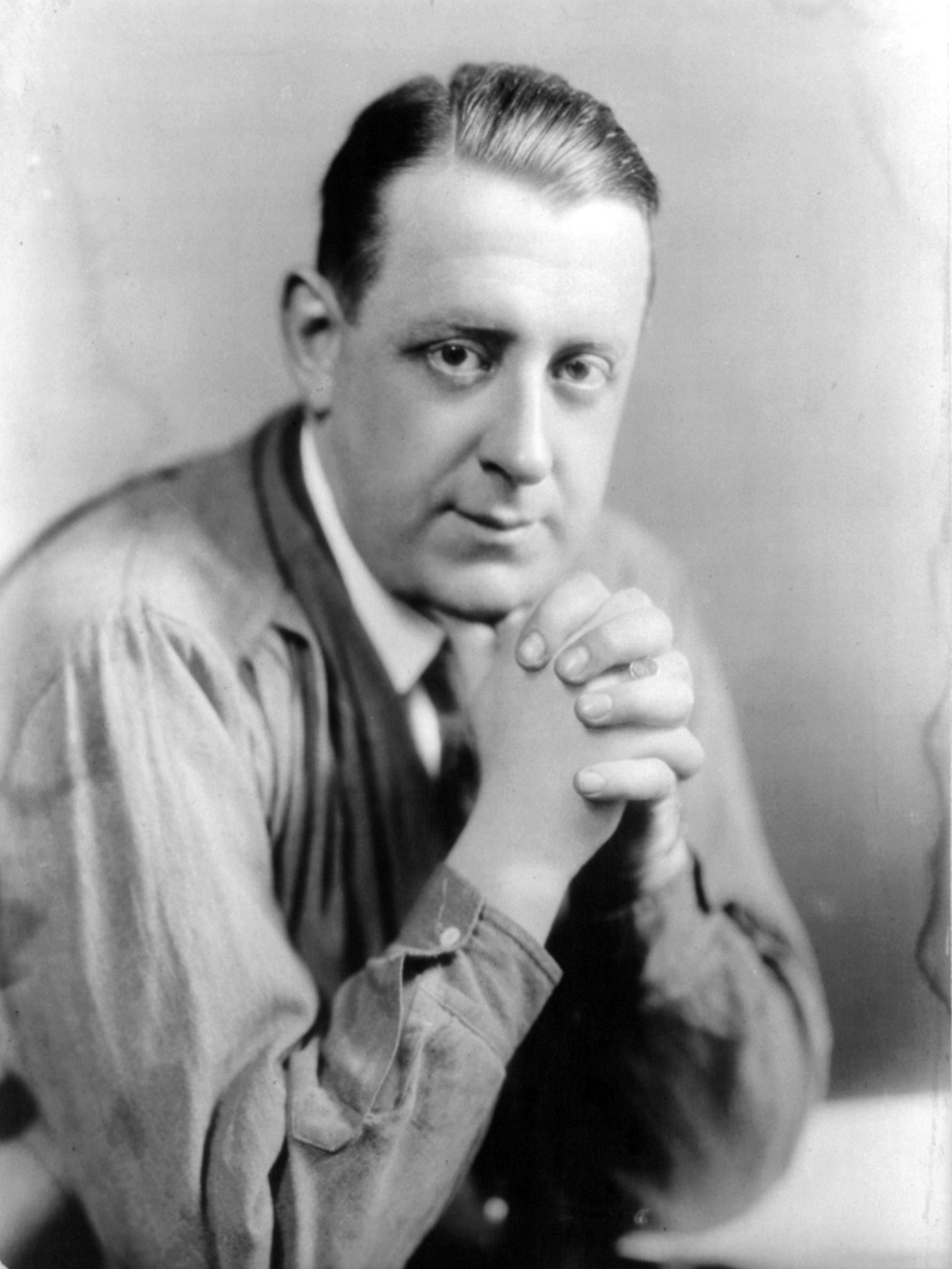
- Born: January 14, 1882; Rotterdam, Netherlands
- Died: March 11, 1944 (aged 62); Connecticut, US
- Education: Cornell University, Ludwig-Maximilians-Universität München
- Occupations: Historian, journalist, author
- Writing career
- Genre: Popular history
- Notable work: The Story of Mankind
- Notable awards: Newbery Medal (1922)

Hendrik Willem van Loon (Note: Asked how to pronounce his name, he told The Literary Digest, "I still stick to the Dutch pronunciation of the double o—Loon like loan in 'Loan and Trust Co.' My sons will probably accept the American pronunciation. It really does not matter very much.") (January 14, 1882 – March 11, 1944) was a Dutch-American historian, journalist, and children's book author.

== Life ==
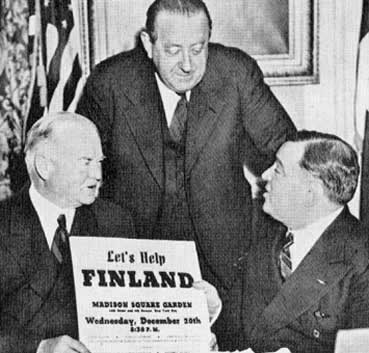
On December 20, 1939, a great sympathy meeting for Finland, then embroiled in the Winter War, was arranged in Madison Square Garden. In the picture from the left are former president Herbert Hoover (chairman of the Finland committee), Dr. van Loon, and the mayor of New York, Fiorello La Guardia.

Van Loon was born in Rotterdam, Netherlands, the son of Hendrik Willem van Loon and Elisabeth Johanna Hanken. He immigrated to the United States in 1902 to study at Harvard University and then Cornell University, where he received his AB in 1905. In 1906 he married Eliza Ingersoll Bowditch (1880–1955), daughter of a Harvard professor, by whom he had two sons, Henry Bowditch and Gerard Willem. The newlyweds moved to Germany, where van Loon received his Ph.D. from the Ludwig-Maximilians-Universität München in 1911 with a dissertation that became his first book, The Fall of the Dutch Republic (1913). He was a correspondent for the Associated Press during the Russian Revolution of 1905 and again in Belgium in 1914 at the start of World War I. He lectured at Cornell University from 1915 to 1916; in 1919 he became an American citizen.

Van Loon had two later marriages, to Eliza Helen (Jimmie) Criswell in 1920 and the playwright Frances Goodrich Ames in 1927, but after a divorce from Ames he returned to Criswell (it is debatable whether they actually remarried), who inherited his estate in 1944.

Van Loon was a dog lover. His most famous dog—named Mungo, after Sir Walter Scott's dog—grew too large to handle and was sent back to Newfoundland, where he was adopted as a mascot by Lieutenant Nick Robson. Mungo was photographed on base with Charlie McCarthy and Edgar Bergen, and flew onboard missions seeking to bomb Nazi U-boats during World War II.

== Career ==
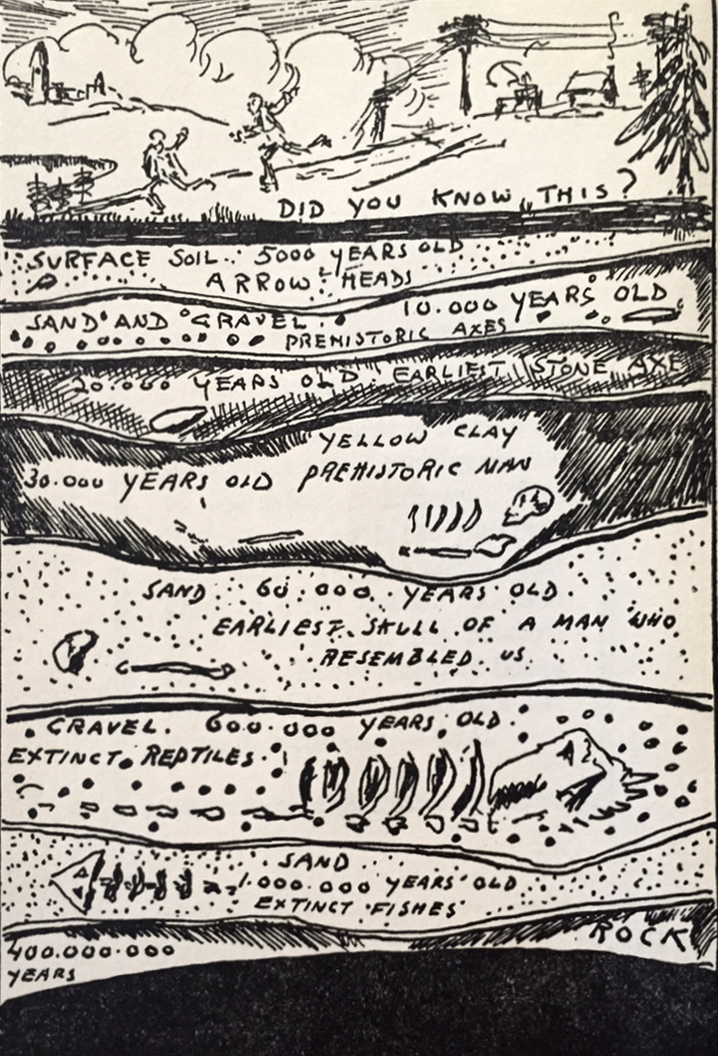
Frontispiece to Van Loon's 1922 book Ancient Man

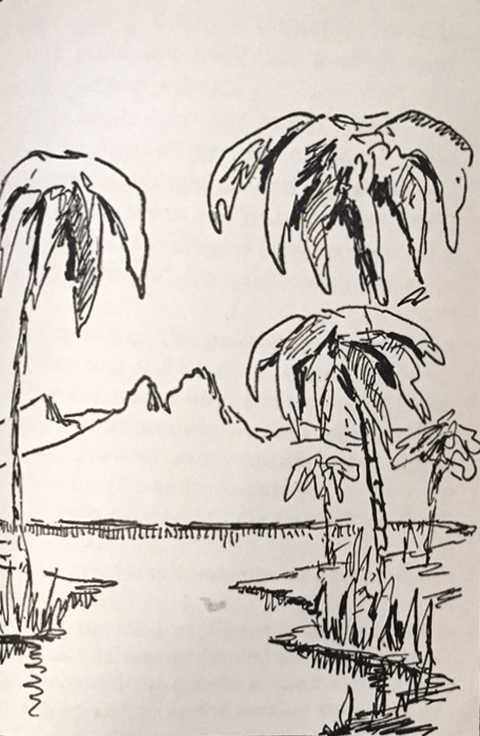
"The Young Nile", illustration by Van Loon for his book Ancient Man, 1922

From the 1910s until his death, Van Loon wrote many books, illustrating them himself. Best remembered among these is The Story of Mankind (1921), a history of the world intended for children, which won the first Newbery Medal in 1922. The book was later updated by Van Loon, then again by his son, and later still by other historians.

He wrote many popular books aimed at young adults. As a writer he was known for emphasizing crucial historical events and giving a full picture of individual characters, as well as the role of the arts in history. He had an informal and thought-provoking style which, particularly in The Story of Mankind, included personal anecdotes. As an illustrator of his own books, he was known for his lively black-and-white drawings and his chronological diagrams.

In 1923 and 1924, he was a professor of history at Antioch College.

After having revisited Germany many times in the 1920s, he was banned from the country when the Nazis came to power. In the summer of 1938, during an extended visit to Scandinavia, Van Loon met with refugees who had recently fled Nazi Germany and who gave him first-hand accounts of the terror that they had experienced. His book Our Battle, Being One Man's Answer to "My Battle" by Adolf Hitler (1938) earned him the respect of Franklin D. Roosevelt, in whose 1940 presidential campaign he worked, calling on Americans to fight totalitarianism.

== Honors and distinctions ==
Van Loon was awarded the Newbery Medal in 1922 for his book The Story of Mankind.

Van Loon was knighted by Queen Wilhelmina of the Netherlands in 1942.

The World War II Liberty Ship SS Hendrik Willem Van Loon was named in his honor.

== Works ==
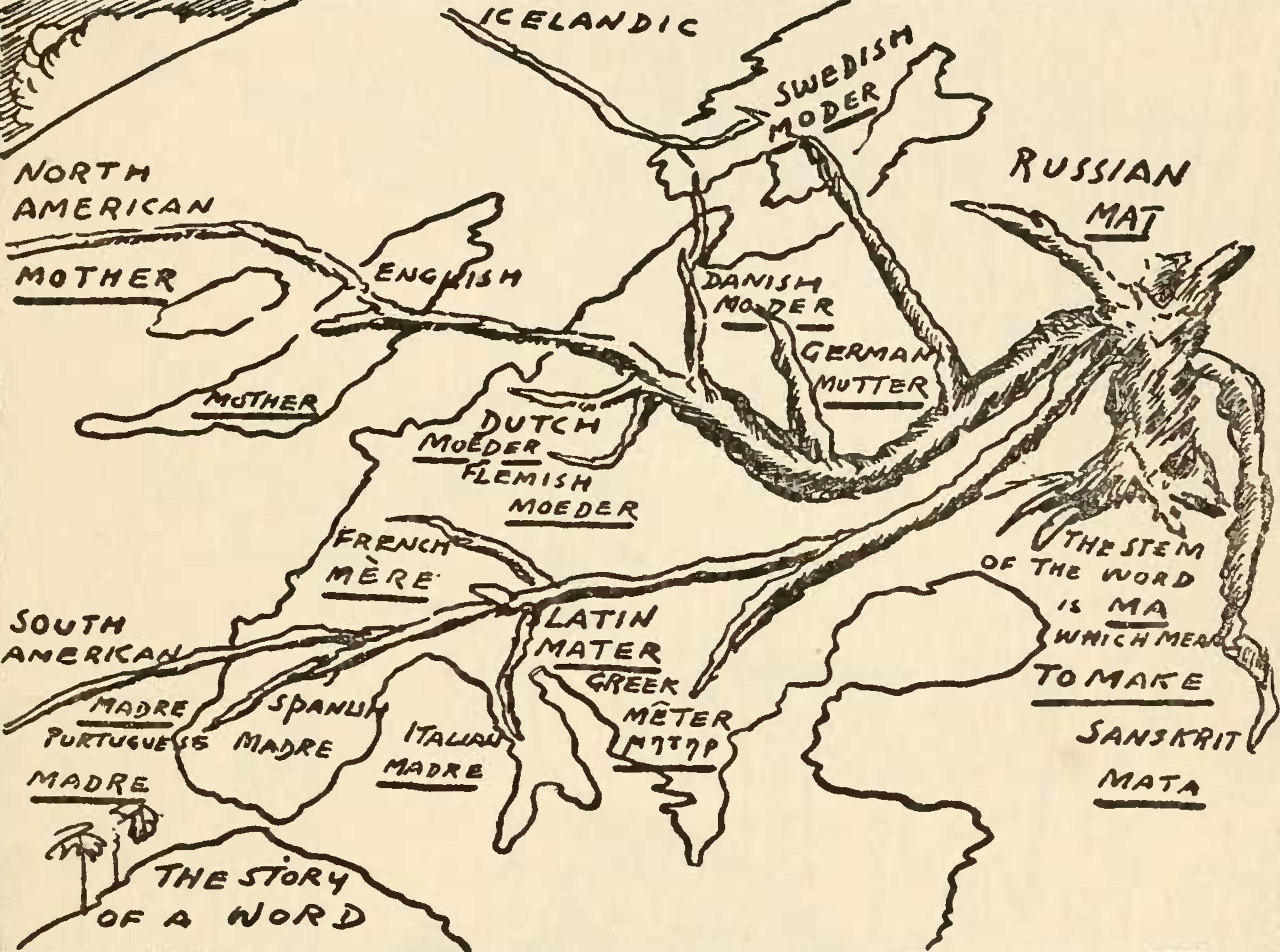
Supposed etymology of the word "mother" in The Story of Mankind, by Hendrik van Loon

A list of works by van Loon, with first publication dates and publishers.

- The Fall of the Dutch Republic, 1913, Houghton Mifflin Co.
- The Rise of the Dutch Kingdom, 1915, Doubleday Page & Co.
- The Golden Book of the Dutch Navigators, 1916, The Century Co.
- A Short History of Discovery: From the Earliest Times to the Founding of Colonies in the American Continent, 1917, David McKay
- Ancient man; the Beginning of Civilizations, 1920, Boni and Liveright
- The Story of Mankind, 1921, Boni and Liveright
- The Story of the Bible, 1923, Boni and Liveright
- Witches and Witch-Finders, 1923, article from the June 1923 Mentor Magazine
- The Story of Wilbur the Hat, 1925, Boni and Liveright
- Tolerance, 1925, Boni and Liveright
- The Liberation of Mankind: the story of man's struggle for the right to think, 1926, Boni and Liveright
- America: The Story of America from the very beginning up to the present, 1927, Boni and Liveright
- Adriaen Block, 1928, Block Hall
- Multiplex man, or the Story of Survival through Invention, 1928, Jonathan Cape
- Life and Times of Peter Stuyvesant, 1928, Henry Holt
- Man the Miracle Maker, 1928, Horace Liveright
- R. v. R.: the Life and Times of Rembrandt van Rijn, 1930, Horace Liveright
- If the Dutch Had Kept Nieuw Amsterdam, in If, Or History Rewritten, edited by J. C. Squire, 1931, Simon & Schuster
- Van Loon's Geography: The Story of the World We Live In, 1932, Simon & Schuster
- To Have or to Be—Take Your Choice, John Day (1932)
- "Gold" 1933, article from the Cosmopolitan March 1933
- An Elephant Up a Tree, 1933, Simon & Schuster
- An Indiscreet Itinerary or How the Unconventional Traveler Should See Holland by one who was actually born there and whose name is Hendrik Willem Van Loon, 1933, Harcourt, Brace
- The Home of Mankind: the story of the world we live in, 1933, George G. Harrap
- The story of inventions: Man, the Miracle Maker, 1934, Horace Liveright
- Ships: and How They Sailed the Seven Seas (5000 B.C.-A.D.1935), 1935, Simon & Schuster
- Around the World With the Alphabet, 1935, Simon & Schuster
- Air-Storming: A Collection of 40 Radio Talks, 1935, Harcourt, Brace
- Love me not, 1935
- A World Divided is a World Lost, 1935, Cosmos Publishing Co.
- The Songs We Sing (with Grace Castagnetta), 1936, Simon & Schuster
- The Arts (with musical illustrations by Grace Castagnetta), 1937, Simon & Schuster
- Christmas Carols (with Grace Castagnetta), 1937, Simon & Schuster
- Observations on the mystery of print and the work of Johann Gutenberg, 1937, Book Manufacturer's Institute/New York Times
- Our Battle: Being One Man's Answer to "My Battle" by Adolf Hitler, 1938, Simon & Schuster
- How to Look at Pictures: a Short History of Painting, 1938, National Committee for Art Appreciation
- Folk Songs of Many Lands (with Grace Castagnetta), 1938, Simon & Schuster
- The Last of the Troubadours: The Life and Music of Carl Michael Bellman 1740-1795 (with Grace Castagnetta), 1939, Simon & Schuster
- The Songs America Sings (with Grace Castagnetta), 1939, Simon & Schuster
- My School Books, 1939, E. I. du Pont de Nemours (Note: My School Books was a chapter from the unpublished autobiography of Hendrik Willem van Loon made by the DuPont chemical company to demonstrate their new 'PX Cloth' on school books, and distributed free at the 1939 New York World's Fair.)
- Invasion, being the personal recollections of what happened to our own family and to some of our friends during the first forty-eight hours of that terrible incident in our history which is now known as the great invasion and how we escaped with our lives, 1940, Harcourt, Brace
- The Story of the Pacific, 1940, George G. Harrap
- The Life and Times of Johann Sebastian Bach, 1940, Simon & Schuster
- Good Tidings (with Christmas songs by Grace Castegnetta), 1941, American Artists Group
- The Praise of Folly by Desiderius Erasmus of Rotterdam, with a short life of the Author by Hendrik Willem van Loon of Rotterdam who also illustrated the Book, 1942
- Van Loon's Lives: Being a true and faithful account of a number of highly interesting meetings with certain historical personages, from Confucius and Plato to Voltaire and Thomas Jefferson, about whom we had always felt a great deal of curiosity and who came to us as dinner guests in a bygone year, 1942, Simon & Schuster
- Christmas Songs, 1942
- The Message of the Bells (with music by Grace Castagnetta), 1942, New York Garden City
- Fighters for Freedom: the Life and Times of Thomas Jefferson and Simon Bolivar, 1943, Dodd, Mead & Co.
- The Life and Times of Scipio Fulhaber, Chef de Cuisine, 1943
- Adventures and Escapes of Gustavus Vasa, and how they carried him from his rather obscure origin to the throne of Sweden, 1945
- Report to Saint Peter, upon the kind of world in which Hendrik Willem van Loon spent the first years of his life - an unfinished, posthumously published autobiography, 1947, Simon & Schuster

Awards
Preceded by (none)	Newbery Medal winner 1922	Succeeded by Hugh Lofting
