= Zenia Larsson =

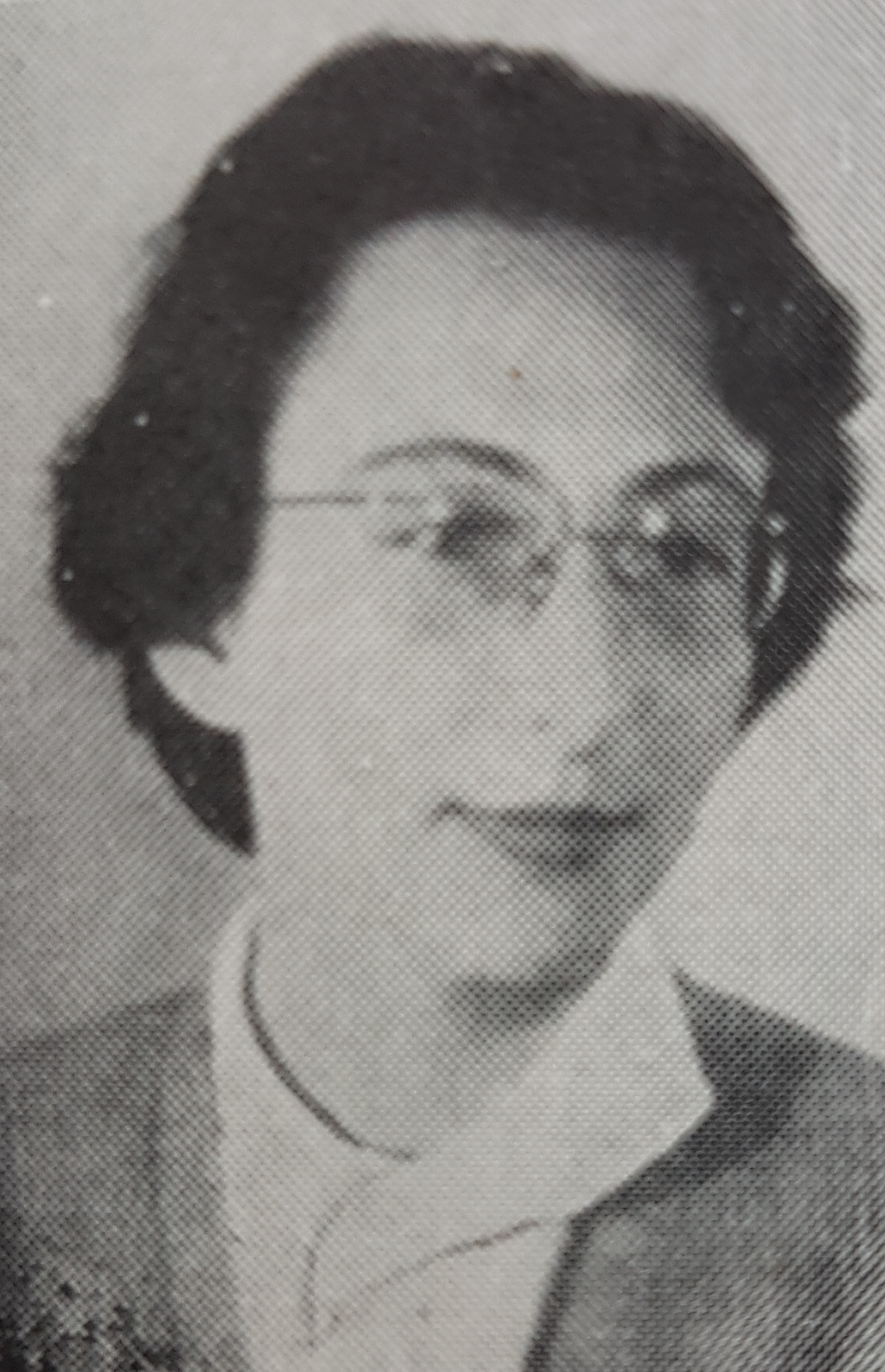
- Born: 2 April 1922; Łódź, Poland
- Died: 4 September 2007 (aged 85); Stockholm, Sweden
- Occupations: Writer, sculptor
- Writing career
- Language: Swedish

Zenia Szajna Larsson, née Marcinkowska (1922–2007) was a Polish-Swedish writer and sculptor of Jewish descent. Larsson was a Holocaust survivor who was among the first in Sweden to describe their war experience.

== Early life ==
She was born on 2 April 1922 in Łódź, as Zenia Marcinkowska. She grew up in a working-class neighbourhood and became friends with Chava Rosenfarb, with whom she later exchanged letters for many years. In the years 1940–1944 she was confined in the Łódź Ghetto. During this time, Zenia's father committed suicide so that his wife and daughter could get his food rations; it was Rosenfarb who discovered the body. After the liquidation of the ghetto, Zenia was deported to the Auschwitz concentration camp, and then moved to Bergen-Belsen, where she was liberated in April 1945. With the help of the Red Cross, she emigrated to Sweden in August of the same year.

== Career ==
In Sweden, she first started studying at Konstfack, then moved on to the Royal Institute of Art, where she studied sculpture with Eric Grate. Working with such materials as wood, terracotta, plaster and marble, Larsson chiefly worked on character studies and portraits, including a portrait of Astrid Lindgren. Her works in public spaces include the Vandraren sculpture in Falun.

In 1960, Larsson made her debut as a writer with the autobiographical novel Skuggorna vid träbron, in which she described the experience of World War II from the point of view of her alter ego, a girl named Paula Levin. It was a first instalment in a war trilogy, which also includes Lang är gryningen (1961) and Livet till mötes (1962). Thus, Larsson became one of the first Holocaust survivors in Sweden to describe their war experiences.

Larsson's literary output includes a number of novels, short stories, essays and radio plays. She also published her letters to Chava Rosenfarb in a collection entitled Brev från en ny verklighet [Letters from a new reality] (1972).

Zenia Larsson died on 4 September 2007 in Stockholm.
