= Elizabeth Cleveland Miller =

American children's author

- Born: Elizabeth Lewis Cleveland; July 13, 1889; Connecticut, US
- Died: September 28, 1936 (aged 47); Wynnewood, Pennsylvania, US
- Occupation: Author
- Writing career
- Genre: Children's literature

Elizabeth Cleveland Miller (July 13, 1889 – September 28, 1936) was a child welfare worker in Albania and an author of children's books in the United States. Her book Pran of Albania was a Newbery Honor recipient in 1930.I

== Biography ==
Elizabeth Cleveland spent much of her youth in Ridgewood, New Jersey, where her father, Edward H. Cleveland, was Episcopalian rector of Christ Church.

During World War I, Cleveland went to Albania as a member of the Junior Red Cross. She remained there after the end of the war doing child welfare work. Upon her return to the United States, she married Benjamin Miller.

She wrote three children's novels: Children of the Mountain Eagle (1927), Pran of Albania (1929), and Young Trajan (1931). Pran of Albania was one of six Newbery Honor titles named in 1930.

Miller died in 1936 at her home in Wynnewood, Pennsylvania. She was survived by her husband and a son, Whitney Benjamin Miller.
