= Jacob's Room =

1922 novel by Virginia Woolf

- First edition
- Author: Virginia Woolf
- Cover artist: Vanessa Bell
- Publisher: Hogarth Press
- Publication date: 26 October 1922
- Publication place: United Kingdom
- Pages: 290

Jacob's Room is the third novel by Virginia Woolf, first published on 26 October 1922. The novel centres around the life story of Jacob Flanders, though it is presented almost entirely through the impressions other characters have of him.

Although it could be said that the book is primarily a character study and has little in the way of plot or background, the narrative is constructed with a void in place of the central character if, indeed, the novel can be said to have a 'protagonist' in conventional terms.

Motifs of emptiness and absence haunt the novel and establish its elegiac feel. Jacob is described to us, but in such indirect terms that it would seem better to view him as an amalgam of the different perceptions of the characters and narrator. He does not exist as a concrete reality, but rather as a collection of memories and sensations.

== Plot summary ==
Set in pre-war England, the novel begins in Jacob's childhood and follows him through college at Cambridge and into adulthood. The story is told mainly through the perspectives of the women in Jacob's life, including the repressed upper-middle-class Clara Durrant and the uninhibited young art student Florinda, with whom he has an affair. His time in London forms a large part of the story, though towards the end of the novel he travels to Italy and then Greece.

== Symbolism ==
Woolf gave the main character the name of Jacob Flanders as a representation of the generation who died in Flanders Fields. She also used poppies to mark the same association, such as the ones in the Greek dictionary "pressed to silk between the pages." (Note: Oxford World's Classics paperback edition, 2022. p.29.)

== Literary significance ==
The novel was first published in 1922 by Hogarth Press. The novel is a departure from Woolf's earlier two novels, The Voyage Out (1915) and Night and Day (1919), which are more conventional in form and narration. The work is seen as an important modernist text; its experimental form is viewed as a progression of the innovative writing style Woolf presented in her earlier collection of short fiction titled Monday or Tuesday (1921). Jacob's Room also demonstrates James Joyce's influence on Woolf, which she herself acknowledged in her diary entries of the period.

== Literary criticism ==
A critic in 1922 gave the novel a negative review, calling it a "phantasmagoria" and "one of the most arrogant books that have been written lately." The writer liked Woolf's previous novels, like The Voyage Out, but hoped that in the future she would return to a more "conventional" writing style.
