= Maud and Miska Petersham =

American writers and illustrators of children's books

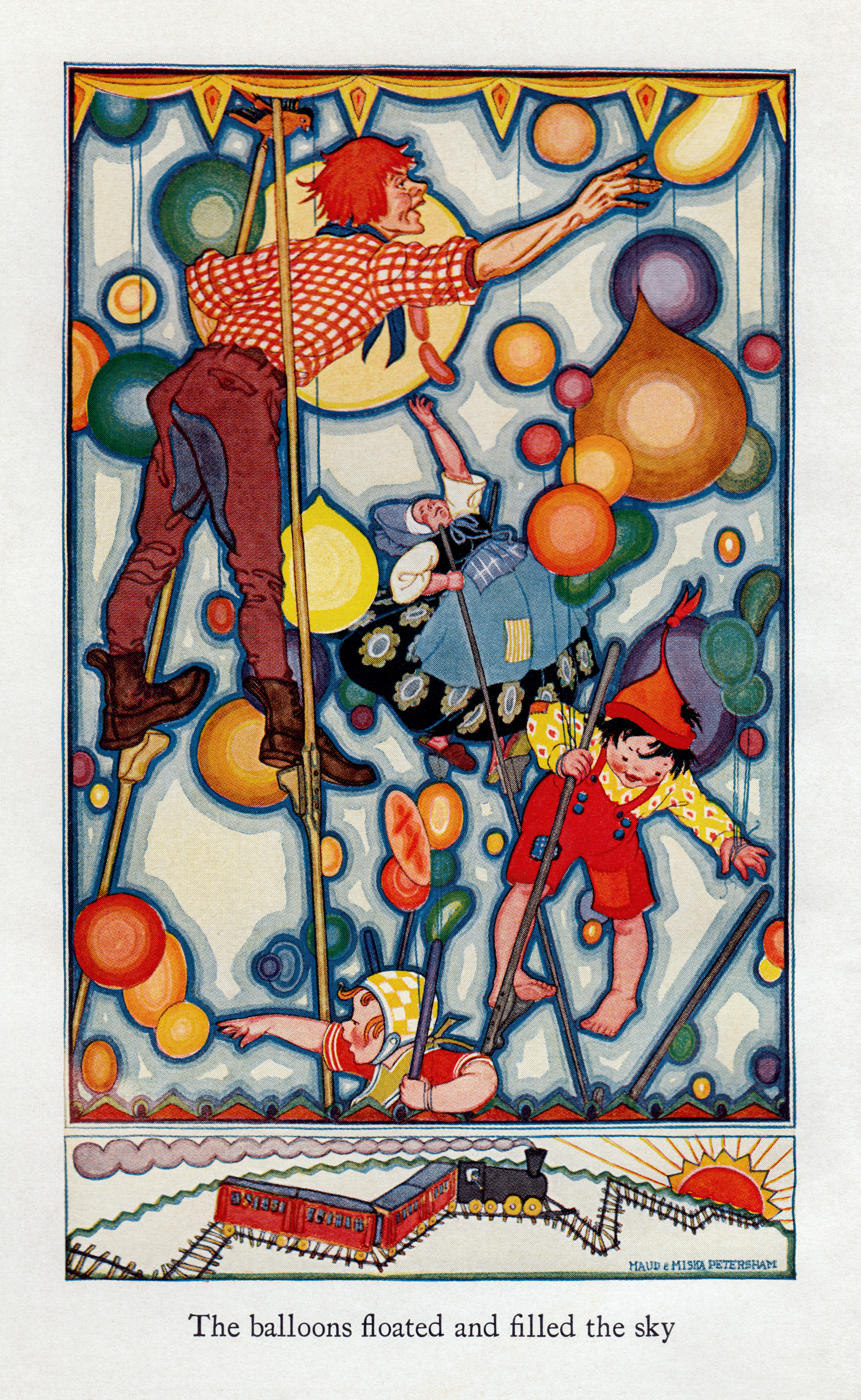
Frontispiece of the 1922 first edition of Carl Sandburg's Rootabaga Stories, illustrated by the Petershams.

Maud Fuller Petersham (August 5, 1890 – November 29, 1971) and Miska Petersham (September 20, 1888 – May 15, 1960) were American writers and illustrators who helped set the direction for illustrated children's books that followed. The Petershams worked closely with such pioneering children's book editors as Louise Seaman Bechtel and May Massee, and with such innovative printers as Charles Stringer and William Glaser. They worked as a seamless partnership for more than five decades. Both prolific and versatile, they produced illustrations for more than 120 trade books and textbooks, anthologies, and picture books. Of the 50 books they both wrote and illustrated, many were recognized with important awards or critical acclaim. They are known for technical excellence, exuberant color, and the introduction of international folk and modernist themes.

== Early life ==
Maud Fuller was born August 5, 1890, in Kingston, New York to a family with deep Yankee roots. Her mother was from the Sisson family, generations of Rhode Island Quakers. Her father descended from the physician on the Mayflower. He was a Baptist minister who moved his family several times. The third of four daughters, Maud graduated from Vassar College in 1912, and later studied at the New York School of Fine and Applied Art. While working at the International Art Service (IAS), a graphic design firm in New York City, she met her future husband, Miska Petersham.

Miska was born Petrezselyem Mihaly in Torokszentmiklos, Hungary, on September 20, 1888, the son of a carpenter and blacksmith. Miska studied at the Royal National School for Applied Arts in Budapest. He completed his studies in 1911 and moved first to London and within six months, travelling steerage, came to New York through Ellis Island in 1912. He quickly found work at the International Art Service, a graphic arts studio with modernist European style founded by Arthur Wiener.

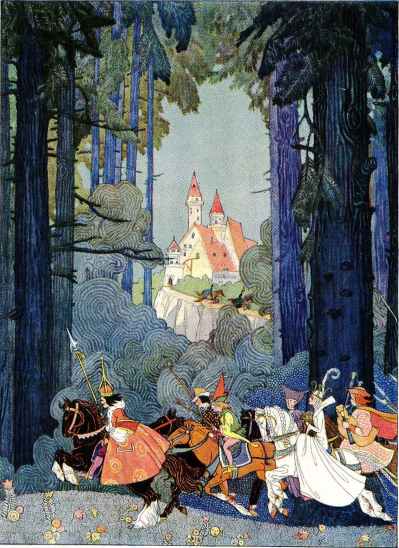
The Enchanted Forest frontispiece

== Early career ==
Maud and Miska met across the drawing board of the IAS studios, and married three years later in 1917. They moved to Greenwich Village in New York City. They obtained their first children's book work through Miska's Hungarian friend Willy Pogany, an established illustrator, and in a few years they had steady illustration commissions and were championed and encouraged by May Massee at Doubleday.

By 1923, they were established and able to buy land and build a house in Woodstock, New York, on the edge of the thriving Byrdcliffe Arts and Crafts Colony. Among the books they illustrated during this period were A Child's Own Book of Verse (Books I and II), Carl Sandburg's Rootabaga Stories, Margery Clark's The Poppyseed Cakes and Johanna Spyri's Heidi. The first book they both wrote and illustrated was Miki, about their son, published in 1929. Maud later was to say, "At first we illustrated books written by others, but often we found no place in the text that lent itself to illustration, so we decided to plan a book of our own with both pictures and text."

The Petershams' work was recognized by the American Institute of Graphic Arts (AIGA). Four of their books were selected for inclusion in the highly competitive AIGA exhibitions in the late 1920s and early 1930s. The titles so honored were Nursery Friends from France, Children of the Mountain Eagle, Tales Told in Holland and Get-A-Way and Háry János. After the American Library Association established the annual Caldecott Medal for children's picture books in 1937, the Petershams were one of the runners-up for An American ABC in 1942 and they won the 1946 Medal. Today they may be known best as creators of that winning work, The Rooster Crows (Macmillan, 1945), a collection of American songs, rhymes, and games.

The Petershams had two children, Miki, and Elizabeth Petersham.

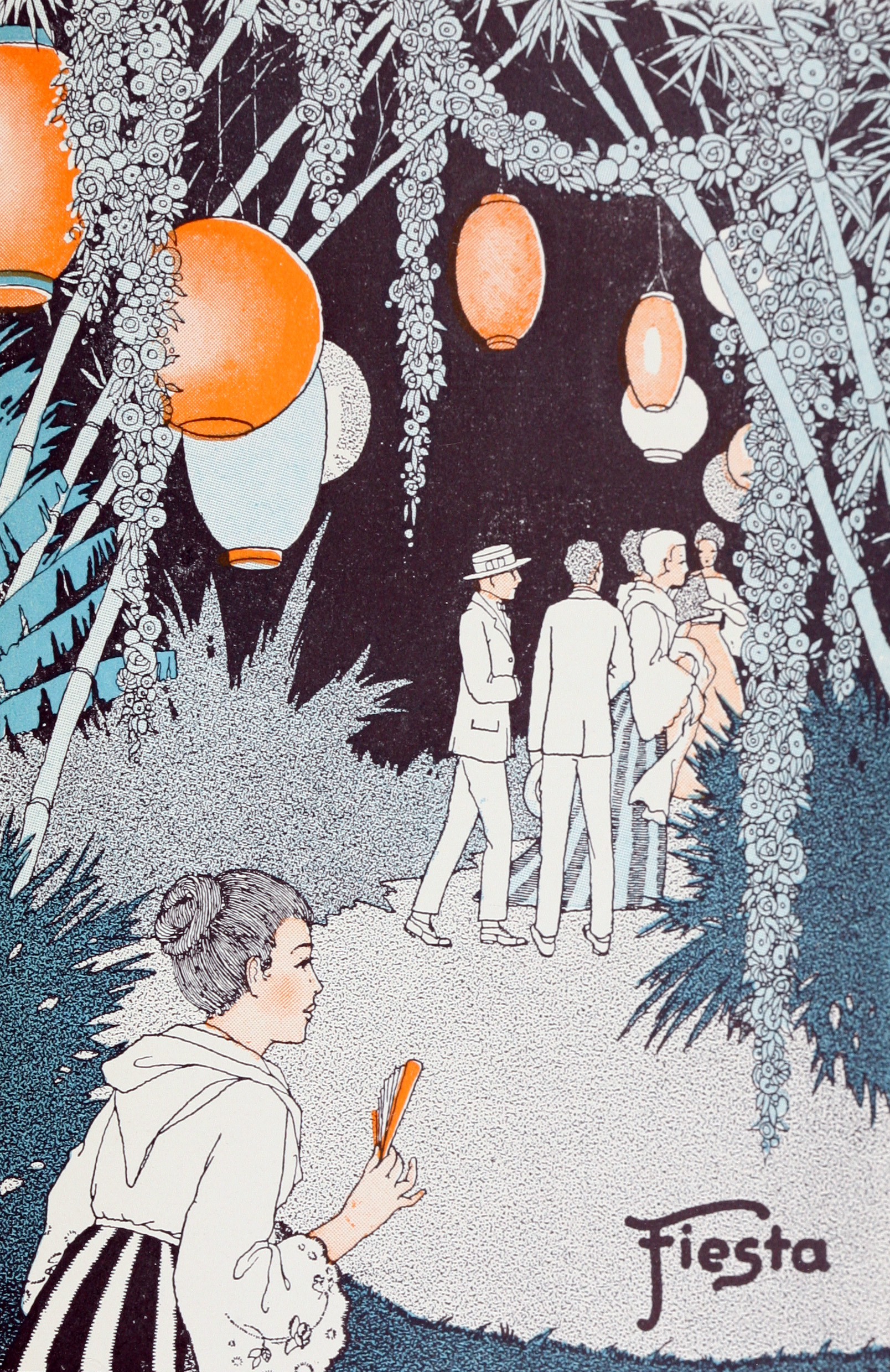
Illustration from Fil and Filippa: Story of Child Life in the Philippines

== Selected works ==
- Tales from Shakespeare by Charles Lamb and Mary Lamb (1923)
- The Billy Bang Book by Mabel Guinnip La Rue (1927)
- Miki: The Book of Maud and Miska Petersham (1929)
- Pran of Albania by Elizabeth Cleveland Miller (1929) Newbery Honor
- The Ark of Father Noah and Mother Noah (1930)
- The Christ Child (1931)
- Auntie and Celia Jane and Miki (1932)
- Get-A-Way and Háry János (1933)
- The Story Book of Things We Use: Houses, Clothes, Food, Transportation (1933) Also published in separate editions
- Miki and Mary: Their Search for Treasures (1934)
- The Story Book of Earth’s Treasures: Gold, Coal, Oil, Iron and Steel (1935) Also published in separate editions
- The Story Book of Wheels, Ships, Trains, Aircraft (1935) Also published in separate editions
- The Story Book of Foods from the Fields: Wheat, Corn, Rice, Sugar (1936) Also published in separate editions
- David: From the Story Told in the First Book of Samuel and the First Book of Kings (1938)
- Joseph and His Brothers (1938)
- Moses: From the Story Told in the Old Testament (1938)
- Ruth: From the Story Told in the Old Testament (1938)
- Stories from the Old Testament (1938)
- The Story Book of Things We Wear: Wool, Cotton, Silk, Rayon (1939)
- An American ABC (1941)
- Susannah, the Pioneer Cow by Miriam E. Mason. Macmillan, 1941.
- Story of Jesus (1942)
- The Rooster Crows: A Book of American Rhymes and Jingles (1945)
- America’s Stamps: The Story of One Hundred Years of U.S. Postage Stamps (1947)
- My Very First Book (1948)
- The Box with Red Wheels (1949)
- The Circus Baby (1950)
- A Bird in the Hand: Sayings from Poor Richard’s Almanac (1951)
- Story of the Presidents of the United States of America (1953)
- Off to Bed: 7 Stories for Wide-Awakes (1954)
- The Boy Who Had No Heart (1955)
- Miss Posy Longlegs by Miriam E. Mason. Macmillan, 1955.
- The Silver Mace: A Story of Williamsburg (1956)
- The Peppernuts (1958)
- The Shepherd Psalm: Psalm XXIII from the Book of Psalms (Maud Petersham alone; 1962)

== 2012 exhibition ==
October 6 to December 31, 2012, "Inspired by the North Light: Maud and Miska Petersham", Woodstock Artists Association and Museum, Woodstock, NY. A companion book for the show, Under the North Light: The Life and Work of Maud and Miska Petersham, by Lawrence Webster, was published by WoodstockArts in 2012. Growing up in Woodstock, Ms. Webster knew the Petershams and often stopped by their home to visit their grandchild, Mary Petersham. The book features a foreword by Philip and Erin Stead.
