= On a Chinese Screen =

1922 travel book by W. Somerset Maugham

- Author: W. Somerset Maugham
- Language: English
- Subject: Nonfiction
- Genre: Travel
- Published: 1922 Heinemann

On a Chinese Screen, also known as On a Chinese Screen: Sketches of Life in China, is a travel book by W. Somerset Maugham, first published in 1922. It is a series of short sketches Maugham made during a trip along the Yangtze River in 1919–1920, and although ostensibly about China the book is equally focused on the various westerners he met during the trip and their struggles to accept or adapt to the cultural differences they encounter, which are often as enormous and as alienating as the country itself.

== Contents ==
1 The Rising of the Curtain - 2 My Lady's Parlour - 3 The Mongol Chief - 4 The Rolling Stone - 5 The Cabinet Minister - 6 Dinner Parties - 7 The Altar of Heaven - 8 The Servants of God - 9 The Inn - 10 The Glory Hole - 11 Fear - 12 The Picture - 13 His Britannic Majesty's Representative - 14 The Opium Den - 15 The Last Chance - 16 The Nun - 17 Henderson - 18 Dawn - 19 The Point of Honour - 20 The Beast of Burden - 21 Dr Macalister - 22 The Road - 23 God's Truth - 24 Romance - 25 The Grand Style - 26 Rain - 27 Sullivan - 28 The Dining-Room - 29 Arabesque - 30 The Consul - 31 The Stripling - 32 The Fannings - 33 The Song of the River - 34 Mirage - 35 The Stranger - 36 Democracy - 37 The Seventh Day Adventist - 38 The Philosopher - 39 The Missionary Lady - 40 A Game of Billiards - 41 The Skipper - 42 The Sights of the Town - 43 Nightfall - 44 The Normal Man - 45 The Old Timer - 46 The Plain - 47 Failure - 48 A Student of the Drama - 49 The Taipan - 50 Metempsychosis - 51 The Fragment - 52 One of the Best - 53 The Sea-Dog - 54 The Question - 55 The Sinologue - 56 The Vice-Consul - 57 A City Built on a Rock - 58 A Libation to the Gods
