= Jiří Haussmann =

Czech writer (1898–1923)

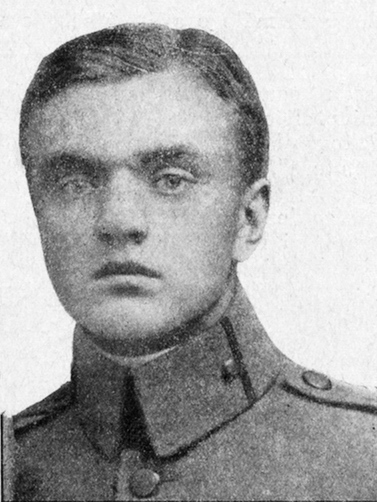
Haussmann in c. 1917–1918

Jiří Haussmann (30 October 1898 – 7 January 1923) was a Czech writer of science fiction and satire.

== Biography ==
Haussmann was born on 30 October 1898 in Prague. At the time of his birth, his father Jiří Haussmann (1868–1935) was an assistant to the High Court in Prague. His mother Františka (née Brabcová) (1872–?) came from Libochovice and Haussmann often stayed there as a boy. At the age of nine, he suffered a bout of otitis media and almost became deaf in his right ear.

Haussmann graduated from the grammar school in the Malá Strana neighborhood of Prague. He enlisted in the Army of the Czech Republic in 1917 for mandatory military service. He served for four months in Prague, then briefly in Kostelec nad Labem, at the officer's school in České Budějovice and finally at the divisional court in Prague. In 1920 he began to practice law at the District Court in Malá Strana, and in 1922 he successfully completed his law studies at Charles University. He contracted tuberculosis in early June of the same year and died a year later. He was buried in Olšany Cemetery.

== Work ==
Haussmann wrote epigrams, verses, and short stories, which he published in the magazines Česká demokracie, Český socialista, Šibeničky and Nebojsa. He also wrote several songs for the Red Seven cabaret. He published anti-Austrian verses under the pseudonyms Georges, Georges Jegor and Dalmanites. He expressed left-wing views and was critical of capitalism. His most significant work is a science fiction story called Velkovýroba ctnosti (The Mass Production of Virtue).

=== Notable works ===
- 1918: Píseň císaře Viléma (A Song of Emperor William), a leaflet with a caricature of Zdeněk Kratochvíl
- 1919: Sketa, a one-act tragedy
- 1919: Zpěvy hanlivé (Derogatory Songs), a collection of satires targeting the Austro-Hungarian monarchy and human smallness
- 1922: Velkovýroba ctnosti (The Mass Production of Virtue), a satirical sci-fi utopia, a reaction to Karel Čapek's novel Továrna na absolutno (The Absolute at Large)
- 1922: Divoké povídky (Wild Short Stories), a collection of feuilletons and short stories, some of which have science fiction themes
- 1923: Občanská válka: politické verše (Civil War: Political Verses)
