= Walter Scott Story =

American writer

Walter Scott Story (June 23, 1879 – June 23, 1955) was an author of children's books and over 140 pulp magazine stories and novelettes.

He was born in Springfield, Massachusetts, the son of Benjamin Franklin Story, a printer from Lyndon, Vermont and Rebecca Jennie Turner of St. Joseph, Michigan. Educated in public schools he began his career in 1895 as an office boy at the Massachusetts Mutual Life Insurance Company in Springfield. On February 27, 1908 he married Margaret Helena Healy. By 1918, they were living in Westfield, Massachusetts and he had become secretary to the president of the company. From 1923 to 1942, he had moved to East Orange, New Jersey and worked in New York City as the manager of literature for the New York Life Insurance Company. His wife died in 1937. On March 14, 1940, he married Elsie Martha Wolcott. They lived in Maplewood, New Jersey.

In his day, Story's works were well-received. The Philadelphia Inquirer described his 1926 children's adventure novel The Uncharted Island as a swift-moving, high-interest tale interesting to children and adult readers both. In 1914, his two-part serialized story "The Cruise of the Rodney Boone" was positively appraised by the Holton Signal as one of the better works in boy's interest magazine American Boy, while Skinny Harrison, Adventurer was similarly lauded by the Brooklyn Daily Eagle in 1922.

Story was the editor of the company's employee magazine, the Mutual Circle, from 1942 to 1946. He was a member of the Republican Party, the Sons of the American Revolution, the Authors League of America, and was a Mason. At his death, he lived in the borough of Chatham, New Jersey.

== Magazine stories ==
- "Snub Smith Vindicates His Honor" Tiptop Semi-Monthly November 1915
- "Trench Mates" Argosy September 1918
- "The Sequel" Weird Tales March (1923) volume 1 number 1
- "Man Hunt" Detective Book Magazine Summer 1938

== Children's books ==
- Skinny Harrison, Adventurer (1922)
- The Young Crusader (1923)
- The Uncharted Island (1926)
- Boy Heroes of the Sea (1928)
- The Missing Millions
