= Mr. Justice Maxell =

1922 novel by Edgar Wallace

- Author: Edgar Wallace
- Language: English
- Genre: Thriller
- Publication date: 1922
- Publication place: United Kingdom
- Media type: Print

Mr. Justice Maxell is a 1922 thriller novel by the British writer Edgar Wallace. Like several of his books it is partly set in Morocco, where Wallace had previously worked as journalist.

== Bibliography ==
- Clark, Neil. Stranger than Fiction: The Life of Edgar Wallace, the Man Who Created King Kong. Stroud, Gloucs.: The History Press, 2015.
