= Velkovýroba ctnosti =

1922 novel by Jiří Haussmann

First edition

Velkovýroba ctnosti is a Czech novel by Jiří Haussmann. It was first published in 1922.
