= Božena Mačingová =

Slovak writer (1922–2017)

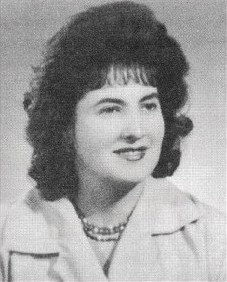
- Born: Etela Božena Mačingová; June 2, 1922; Košice, Czechoslovakia
- Died: November 23, 2017 (aged 95); Košice, Slovakia
- Occupation: Writer
- Writing career
- Pen name: Tetka Betka, Teta Božena
- Language: Slovak
- Period: 1947–1989
- Genres: Children's literature, young adult literature

Etela Božena Mačingová (2 June 1922 – 23 November 2017) was a Slovak writer, an author of books for children and young adults.

== Biography ==
Mačingová was born and raised in Košice. When World War II started, she was still a student. Soon after the outbreak of the war, Košice was occupied by the Hungarian forces and Mačingová had to flee the city. Until the end of the war she lived in Prešov and Veľký Šariš, where she met her husband, although she kept publishing her writings under her maiden name for the rest of the war.

In 1950 Mačingová returned to Košice and started working as a clerk while producing plays for the public radio broadcaster Slovenský Rozhlas. In 1952 she started working directly for Slovenský Rozhlas, where she was employed until her retirement in 1982.

Mačingová spent her entire professional life in Košice with the exception of a short period in the 1950s, when her position at the Slovenský Rozhlas was moved to Bratislava. She died in Košice on 23 November 2017. She was 95 years old.

== Publications ==
Most of Mačingová's writings were intended for children. Written under the pseudonyms Tetka Betka and Teta Božena (Auntie Betka, Aunt Božena), her children's stories often followed the structure of simple moral fables featuring anthropomorphic animals, but commonly alluded to more complex social issues affecting children, such as conflicts between parents.

Many of her writings are based on stories she invented for her own small children. The most popular of her children's books is Danuška (1962), which reflects the emotions of a small girl suffering due to her parents' marriage problems and poverty.

The most influential of Mačingová's books for young adults is Bethka a Veterné Mesto (1983), which is partly autobiographical.
