= Rootabaga Stories =

Children's book written by Carl Sandburg

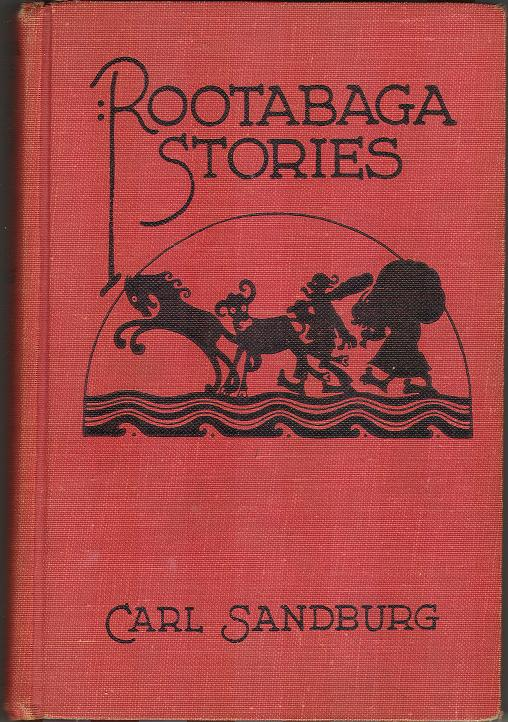
- Cover of the first edition (1922) of what is sometimes called Book One; illustrated by Maud and Miska Petersham
- Author: Carl Sandburg
- Language: English
- Publication date: 1922

Rootabaga Stories (1922) is a children's book of interrelated short stories by Carl Sandburg. The whimsical, sometimes melancholy stories, which often use nonsense language, were originally created for his own daughters. Sandburg had three daughters, Margaret, Janet and Helga, whom he nicknamed "Spink", "Skabootch" and "Swipes", and those nicknames occur in some of his Rootabaga stories.

== Development ==
The "Rootabaga" stories were born of Sandburg's desire for "American fairy tales" to match American childhood. He felt that the European stories involving royalty and knights were inappropriate, and so set his stories in a fictionalized American Midwest called "the Rootabaga country" with fairy-tale concepts such as corn fairies mixed with farms, trains, sidewalks, and skyscrapers.

A large number of the stories are told by the Potato Face Blind Man, an old minstrel of the Village of Liver-and-Onions who hangs out in front of the local post office. His impossibly acquired firsthand knowledge of the stories adds to the book's narrative feel and fantastical nature. In the Preface of the little-known Potato Face, Sandburg wrote, "it is in Rootabaga Country, and in the biggest village of that country, the Potato Face Blind Man sits with his accordion on the corner nearest the post office. There he sits with his eyes never looking out and always searching in. And sometimes he finds in himself the whole human procession."

Sandburg went on about the storyteller, "In fact, he sometimes indicates that when he needs an animal or fool not yet seen or heard of, he can make it for himself and give it a character so it is real to him, and when he talks about it and tells its story, it is like telling about one of his own children. He seems to love some of the precious things that are cheap, such as stars, the wind, pleasant words, time to be lazy, and fools having personality and distinction. He knows, it seems, that young people are young no matter how many years they live; that there are children born old and brought up to be full of fear; that a young heart keeps young by a certain measure of fooling as the years go by; that men and women old in years sometimes keep a fresh child heart and, to the last, salute the dawn and the morning with a mixture of reverence and laughter."

== Sequels ==
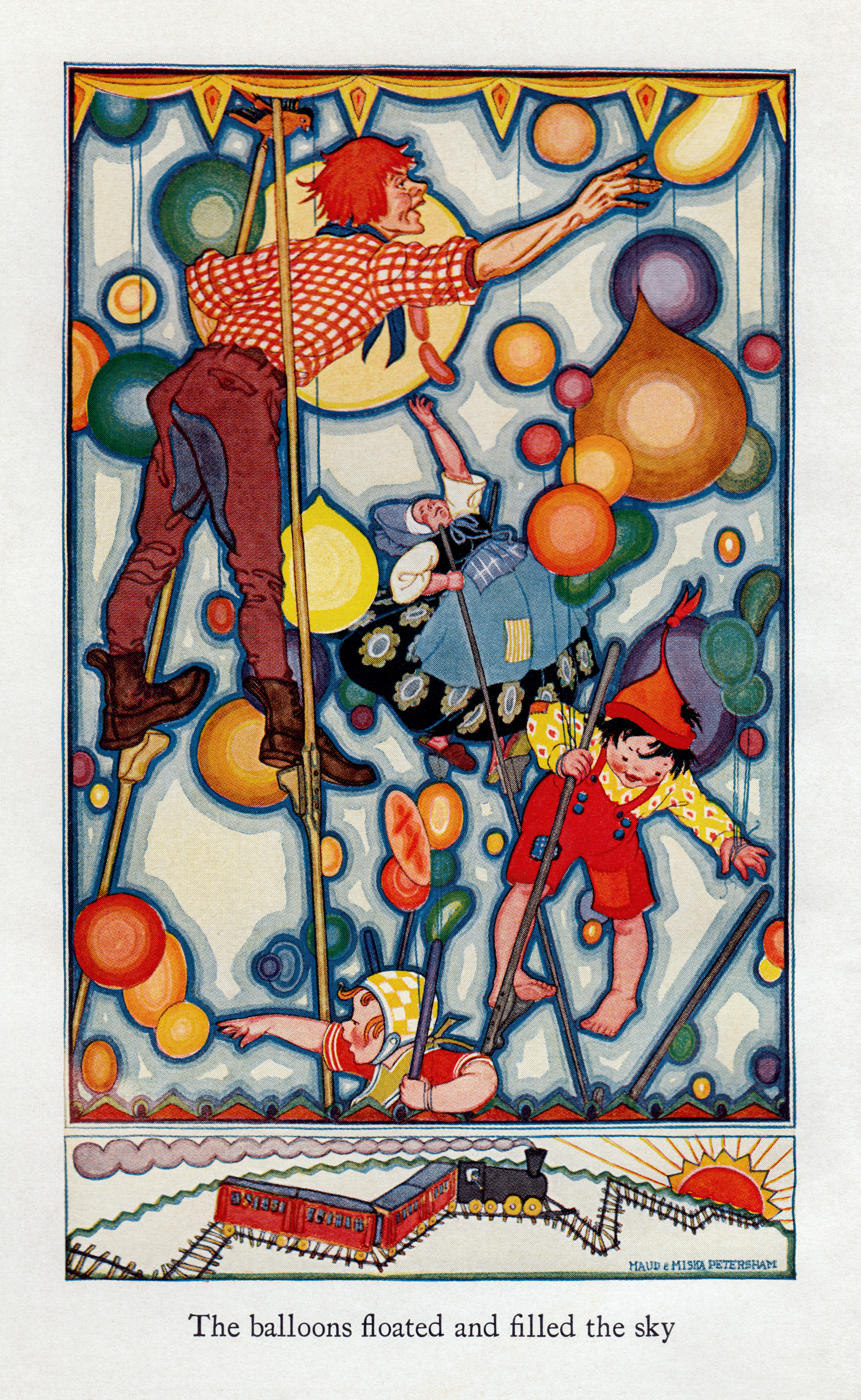
Frontispiece of the 1922 first edition of Rootabaga Stories. Illustration by Maud and Miska Petersham.

Rootabaga Stories was followed by a sequel, Rootabaga Pigeons, published in 1923. A little known volume of Rootabaga stories called Potato Face was published in 1930 by Harcourt, Brace and Company. It was not illustrated. A collection of previously unpublished stories was published as More Rootabagas in 1993 with illustrations by Paul O. Zelinsky.

== Recordings ==
A vinyl LP of Carl Sandburg reading some of the stories, Rootabaga Stories as told by Carl Sandburg was released on Caedmon (TC 1089) in 1958; the cassette version is Caedmon CDL 51089. Contents:

- "How They Broke Away to Go to the Rootabaga Country"
- "How They Bring Back the Village of Cream Puffs"
- "How the Five Rusty Rats Helped Find a New Village"
- "How Six Pigeons Came Back to Hatrack the Horse"
- "How the Three Wild Babylonian Baboons Went Away in the Rain"
- "How Six Umbrellas Took Off Their Straw Hats to Show Respect"
- "How Googler and Gaggler, the Two Christmas Babies, Came Home"

There are two other recordings of Rootabaga stories by Sandburg, How to Tell Corn Fairies When You See 'Em and Others of His Rootabaga Stories (Caedmon TC 1159) and Rootabaga Stories Vol. 3 (Caedmon TC 1306).

Podcast The Folktale Project also tells renditions of Rootabaga tales.

== Illustrated editions ==
- Never Kick a Slipper at the Moon at Google Books, illustrated by Rosanne Litzinger, 2008.

== See also ==
- The Wonderful Wizard of Oz and American Fairy Tales, two efforts by L. Frank Baum to devise American fairy tales.
