= Life in Squares =

- Genre: Drama
- Written by: Amanda Coe
- Directed by: Simon Kaijser
- Composer: Edmund Butt
- Country of origin: United Kingdom
- Original language: English
- No. of series: 1
- No. of episodes: 3

Production
- Executive producers: Amanda Coe; Douglas Rae; Lucy Bedford; Lucy Richer
- Producer: Rhonda Smith
- Production locations: London; Charleston Farmhouse
- Running time: 60 minutes
- Production companies: Ecosse Films; Tiger Aspect Productions

Original release
- Network: BBC Two; BBC Two HD
- Release: 27 July – 10 August 2015

Life in Squares is a British television mini-series that was broadcast on BBC Two from 27 July to 10 August 2015. The title comes from Dorothy Parker's witticism that the Bloomsbury Group, whose lives it portrays, had "lived in squares, painted in circles and loved in triangles".

== Plot ==
The three-part serial centres on the close and often fraught relationship between sisters, Vanessa Bell and Virginia Woolf, and Vanessa’s sexually complicated alliance with gay artist Duncan Grant as they, and their group of like-minded friends, navigate their way through love, sex and artistic life through the first half of the 20th century.

== Production ==
The series was commissioned by Ben Stephenson and Lucy Richer, and produced by Ecosse Films in association with Tiger Aspect Productions. The executive producers are Lucy Bedford, Amanda Coe, Douglas Rae and Lucy Richer. Filming began in August 2014 in London and Charleston Farmhouse.

== Cast ==
The main roles were played by:

- Eve Best as Older Vanessa Bell
- Ed Birch as Lytton Strachey
- Lucy Boynton as Angelica Garnett
- Jack Davenport as David Garnett
- Jerome Finch as Saxon Sydney-Turner
- Phoebe Fox as Young Vanessa Bell
- Andrew Havill as Older Clive Bell
- Guy Henry as Older Leonard Woolf
- Sam Hoare as Young Clive Bell
- Finn Jones as Julian Bell
- Edmund Kingsley as John Maynard Keynes
- Catherine McCormack as Virginia Woolf
- Lydia Leonard as Young Virginia Woolf
- James Northcote as Adrian Stephen
- James Norton as Young Duncan Grant
- Rupert Penry-Jones as Older Duncan Grant
- Al Weaver as Young Leonard Woolf
- Eleanor Bron as Aunt Mary
- Deborah Findlay as Aunt Jane
- Anton Lesser as Dr. Hyslop

== Critical reception ==
Writing in UK newspaper The Guardian, Lucy Mangan found that, "The drama took a certain effort of will to get into. You just have to accept that you are in a world where people convened salons, and probably did say things like 'Childe Harold is a load of posturing nonsense! It can’t hold a candle to Don Juan, even if the alexandrines are forced to breaking point!'" However, having made this effort, Mangan added: "[…] it’s very, very good. From Phoebe Fox and Lydia Leonard as the loving/warring sisters Vanessa, soon-to-be-Bell, and Virginia, slightly-later-to-be-Woolf, around whose increasingly strained relationship the story essentially revolves, to the doctor in a single scene realising his patient (the painter Duncan Grant) is 'an invert', the performances are uniformly wonderful (though Ed Birch as Lytton Strachey has so far the best part and the best time). And the script – once you take that linguistic leap of faith – is glorious. 'That’s what they do,' muses Virginia as she and Vanessa ponder the proclivities of the men in their house and lives. 'Exclude us. From clubs. Schools. Orifices.' Though on the last, Vanessa comes to disagree. She marries the uninverted Clive Bell and sends her sister a letter. 'Copulation a tremendous success!' Attagirl".

In The Independent, Ellen E Jones was less impressed, writing: "The romantic entanglements of this set are so complicated that there is an undeniable achievement in laying them out clearly, as writer Amanda Coe has done here. Alas, the work's the thing and while this opening episode contained all the gossip, it conveyed none of the depth of thought or artistic feeling that must ultimately justify our interest (if any) in these people". She concluded by citing both BBC Radio 4’s parody of the Bloomsbury Group, Gloomsbury, and the "excellent" BBC Four documentary How to Be Bohemian, as having "advanced an alternative view of the set as, essentially, self-indulgent ninnies, cosseted by their wealth. If you've had the pleasure of either programme it would have been especially difficult to take this new drama seriously".

== Broadcast ==
Internationally, the series premiered in Australia on 27 October 2015 on BBC First.
