= Henrietta Garnett =

English writer and artist (1945–2019)

Henrietta Catherine Garnett
- Born: 15 May 1945
- Died: 4 September 2019 (aged 74)
- Occupation: Writer
- Spouse(s): Burgo Partridge (1962–63, his death); John Couper; John Baker
- Parents: David Garnett (father); Angelica Garnett (mother)
- Family: Amaryllis Garnett (sister)

Henrietta Catherine Garnett (15 May 1945 – 4 September 2019) was an English writer and artist.

== Early life and family ==
Garnett was the second of the four daughters of David and Angelica Garnett. Her father was a writer. Her mother, the daughter of Vanessa Bell and the painter Duncan Grant, and a niece of Virginia Woolf.

The four sisters had an unconventional childhood. Growing up at Hilton Hall, near St Ives in Huntingdonshire, Henrietta and her sisters Amaryllis, Nerissa, and Fanny were all sent to the co-educational Huntingdon Grammar School. They took leading parts in school plays and were creative. At home, they had a farm, with cows, an orchard, a swimming pool, and sculptures. Garnett also spent holidays at her grandparents' Charleston Farmhouse, sometimes sitting for its painters. She later wrote of Charleston "It was an extraordinary treasure chest overflowing with familiar curiosities, beauty, ideas, people and jokes."

Garnett later claimed that after the age of ten she had always been in love. She wanted to become an actress and blamed her failure to do so on a lack of formal education and mental discipline. In 1962, aged seventeen and pregnant, Henrietta married Burgo Partridge. Ten years older than her, he was the son of Ralph and Frances Partridge. His mother's sister, Ray Marshall, had been the first wife of Henrietta's father, David Garnett. Burgo Partridge died suddenly of heart failure on 7 September 1963, three weeks after the birth of their daughter Sophie Vanessa, leaving his wife a widow at the age of eighteen.

== Career ==
Now a single mother, Henrietta was swept into the hedonistic life of the swinging Sixties. After a time of nightclubs in Marbella, she joined a group led by Mark Palmer that travelled around England in a convoy of horse-drawn caravans, in support of love and peace, a group later called by Garnett "chequebook hippies". She had several boyfriends and married twice more, her second husband being an art dealer, John Couper, and her third John Baker, a writer she met on a train. This led to her appearing in a BBC television 40 Minutes programme on the topic of love at first sight.

Garnett's cousin Virginia Nicholson later recalled that "Everything about her, from the overpowering scent of Guerlain's L'Heure Bleue over breakfast, to the limitless Gauloises habit; from her deft skill with rough-puff pastry, to her passion for the Victorian novel – exuded fascination." In 1977, Garnett threw herself off a hotel roof in London, a suicide attempt which left her with severe injuries. A few years later, she went to live with Mark Divall, a former gardener at Charleston, in Normandy, and later in Provence. Her only novel, Family Skeletons, was published in 1986. About early romance, its storyline included incest and suicide, and in the light of the author's Bloomsbury background, readers looked for parallels with real life.

In 2001, she returned to live in England, acquiring a small house in Chelsea, and then a cottage in Sussex. In 2004, she published Anny: A Life of Anne Isabella Thackeray Ritchie, a biography of William Makepeace Thackeray's daughter Anne Ritchie, who was a sister-in-law of Henrietta Garnett's great-grandfather Leslie Stephen, converted into Mrs Hilberry in her great-aunt Virginia Woolf's Night and Day. This book was followed by Wives and Stunners: The Pre-Raphaelites and Their Muses (2012), about the female partners, mistresses, and models of the pre-Raphaelite artists.

Garnett died of pancreatic cancer, aged 74. An obituary in The Guardian said of her:

None of life's vicissitudes could dent Henrietta's bewitching beauty. She was droll, mischievous and uninhibited. She could be exasperating – a menace, even, after one glass too many of red wine – but she was also deeply affectionate and intensely loyal. Quiet courage was perhaps her most impressive quality, a stoical refusal to succumb to self-pity which she maintained till the end.
