= Quentin Bell =

British art historian (1910–1996)

Quentin Claudian Stephen Bell
- Born: 19 August 1910; London, England
- Died: 16 December 1996 (aged 86); Sussex, England
- Education: Leighton Park School; University of Cambridge
- Occupations: Art historian & author
- Employer(s): Durham University; University of Leeds; University of Oxford; University of Hull; University of Sussex
- Spouse: Anne Olivier Popham (m. 1952)
- Children: Virginia Bell (daughter); Cressida Bell (daughter); Julian Bell (son)
- Parents: Clive Bell (father); Vanessa Stephen (mother)
- Relatives: Virginia Woolf (aunt); Leonard Woolf (uncle); Julian Bell (brother); Angelica Garnett (half-sister); Amaryllis Garnett (niece); Henrietta Garnett (niece)

Quentin Claudian Stephen Bell (19 August 1910 – 16 December 1996) was an English art historian and author.

== Early life ==
Bell was born in London, the second and younger son of the art critic and writer Clive Bell and the painter and interior designer Vanessa Bell (née Stephen). He was a nephew of Virginia Woolf (née Stephen). He was educated at the Quaker Leighton Park School and at Cambridge.

== Career ==
After being educated at Leighton Park School and in Paris, Bell became a Lecturer in Art History at the Department of Fine Art, King's College, University of Durham from 1952 to 1962, then became the first Professor of Fine Art at the University of Leeds from 1962 to 1967. While there he allowed art and english student Sue Crockford to study two films even though film was not yet regarded as an art form. During 1964–65, he was appointed Slade Professor of Fine Art at Oxford University and, during 1965–66, Ferens Professor of Fine Art at the University of Hull. Bell was a Professor of the History and Theory of Art at the University of Sussex from 1967 to 1975.

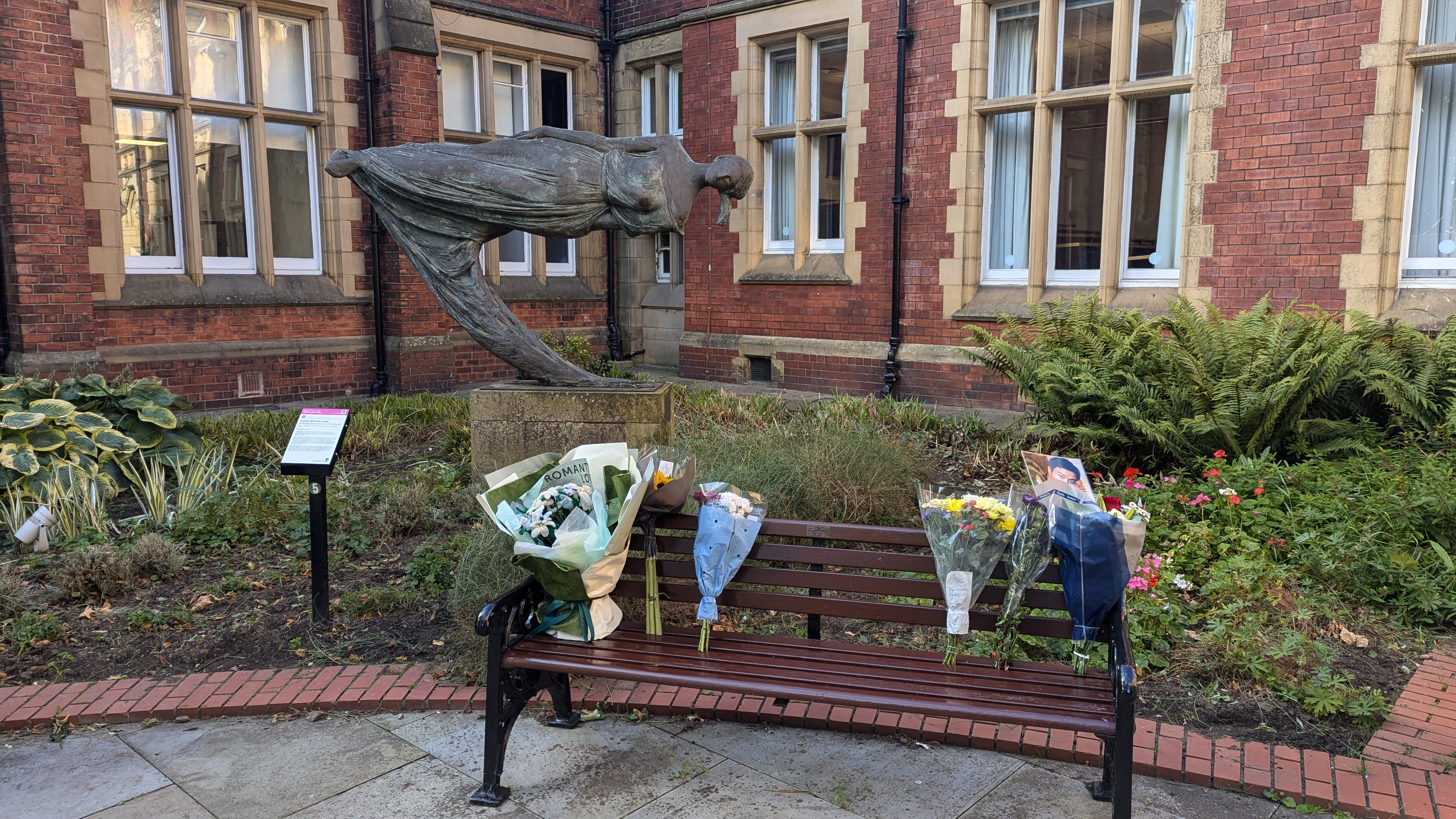
Levitating Woman, 'The Dreamer' at the Stanley & Audrey Burton Gallery, University of Leeds.

He sometimes worked as an artist, principally in ceramics, but for his career he was drawn to academia and to book-writing. Bell's biography of his famous aunt, Virginia Woolf: A Biography, 2 vols (London: Hogarth Press, 1972), won not only the James Tait Black Memorial Prize, but also the Duff Cooper Prize and the Yorkshire Post Book of the Year Award. He also wrote several books on the Bloomsbury Group and Charleston Farmhouse.

Bell retired in 1975 and later worked as a potter. He was also a painter and sculptor, producing the sculpture Levitating Woman, 'The Dreamer' in 1982, on view at the Stanley & Audrey Burton Gallery in Leeds. His portraits are held in the National Portrait Gallery, London. His portrait was painted by Vanessa Bell and Duncan Grant.

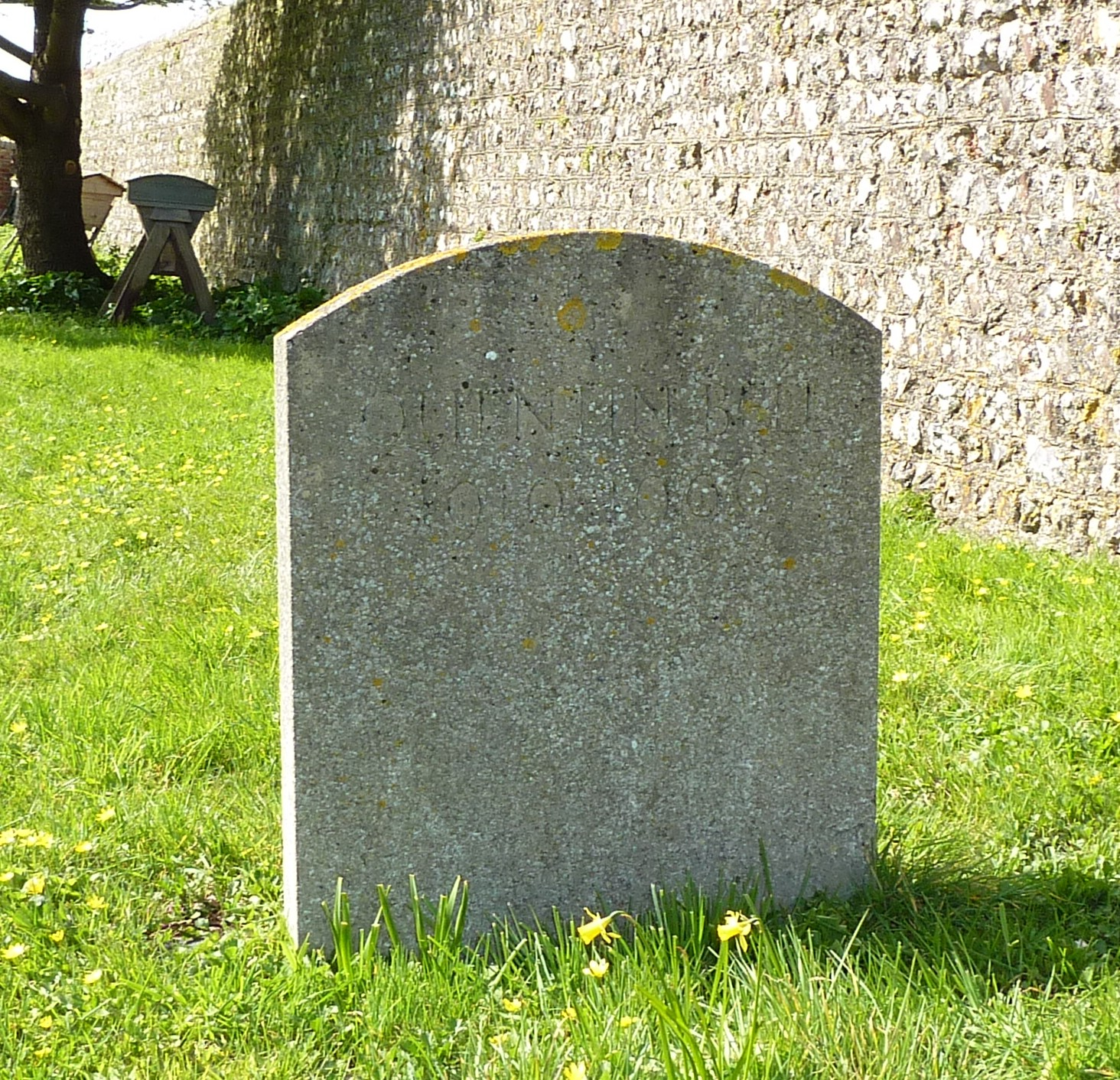
Quentin Bell's tombstone at St. Peter’s Church, West Firle, East Sussex

== Family ==
He was married to Anne Olivier Bell (née Popham). They had three children: Julian Bell, an artist and muralist; Cressida Bell, a textile designer; and Virginia Nicholson, the writer of Charleston: A Bloomsbury House and Garden, Among the Bohemians and Singled Out. Bell had an older brother, the poet Julian Bell, who died in the Spanish Civil War in 1937. The writer and artist Angelica Garnett was his half-sister, and Amaryllis and Henrietta Garnett were his nieces.

== Death ==
Quentin Bell died in Sussex, and is buried in the churchyard of St. Peter’s Church, West Firle, East Sussex.
