= Hilton, Cambridgeshire =

Village in Cambridgeshire, England

Coordinates: 52.28°N 0.11°W

Hilton
- Hilton Turf Maze

- Location within Cambridgeshire
- Population: 1,052 (2011)
- OS grid reference: TL289661
- Shire county: Cambridgeshire
- Region: East
- Country: England
- Sovereign state: United Kingdom
- Post town: HUNTINGDON
- Postcode district: PE28
- Police: Cambridgeshire
- Fire: Cambridgeshire
- Ambulance: East of England
- UK Parliament: Huntingdon

The Church of St Mary Magdalene, Hilton

Hilton is a village and civil parish in Cambridgeshire, England. Hilton lies approximately 11 miles (18 km) north-west of Cambridge. Hilton is situated in Huntingdonshire, a non-metropolitan district of Cambridgeshire as well as a historic county of England. The parish adjoins those of Elsworth, Fenstanton, Hemingford Abbots, Hemingford Grey, Papworth Everard and Papworth St Agnes. The Church of England parish church is dedicated to St Mary Magdalene and is a Grade I listed building; it has a peal of six bells.

A fragment of a wall painting on plaster, made for Captain Sparrow (1601–1651), at Park Farm, Hilton, probably around the time of his marriage in 1633, is now in the Victoria & Albert Museum, London. The fragment depicts two figures representing the senses of Taste and Sight and was given by David Garnett and his wife Angelica Bell of Hilton Hall, who were members of the Bloomsbury Group.

On the village green is a turf maze, originally cut by William Sparrow in 1660.

== Government ==
As a civil parish Hilton has a parish council. The parish council is elected by the residents of the parish who have registered on the electoral roll; the parish council is the lowest tier of government in England. A parish council is responsible for providing and maintaining a variety of local services including allotments and a cemetery, as well as grass cutting and tree planting in public open spaces such as a village green or playing fields. The parish council reviews all planning applications that might affect the parish and makes recommendations to Huntingdonshire District Council, which is the local planning authority, for the parish. The parish council also represents the views of the parish on issues such as local transport, policing and the environment. The parish council raises its own tax to pay for these services, known as the parish precept, which is collected as part of the Council Tax.

Hilton was in the historic and administrative county of Huntingdonshire until 1965. From 1965 the village was part of the new administrative county of Huntingdon and Peterborough. Then in 1974, following the Local Government Act 1972, Hilton became a part of the county of Cambridgeshire.

The second tier of local government is Huntingdonshire District Council, which is a non-metropolitan district of Cambridgeshire and has its headquarters in Huntingdon. Huntingdonshire District Council has 52 councillors representing 29 district wards. Huntingdonshire District Council collects the council tax, and provides services such as building regulations, local planning, environmental health, leisure and tourism. Hilton is a part of the district ward of The Hemingfords and is represented on the district council by two councillors. District councillors serve for four year terms following elections to Huntingdonshire District Council.

For Hilton, the highest tier of local government is Cambridgeshire County Council which has administrative buildings in Cambridge. The county council provides county-wide services such as major road infrastructure, fire and rescue, education, social services, libraries and heritage services. Cambridgeshire County Council consists of 69 councillors representing 60 electoral divisions. Hilton is part of the electoral division of The Hemingfords and Fen Stanton and is represented on the county council by one councillor.

For parliamentary elections, Hilton is in the constituency of Huntingdon, and elects one Member of Parliament (MP) by the first past the post system of election. Hilton is represented in the House of Commons by Ben Obese-Jecty (Conservative), he has represented the constituency since 2024. The previous members of parliament were John Major (Conservative) who represented the constituency between 1983 and 2001 and Jonathan Djanogly 2001 to 2024.

== Demography ==
=== Population ===
In the period 1801 to 1901 the population of Hilton was recorded every ten years by the UK census. During this time the population was in the range of 223 (recorded in 1801) to 387 (recorded in 1861).

From 1901 a census has been taken every ten years, with the exception of 1941 (owing to the Second World War).

Parish	1911	1921	1931	1951	1961	1971	1981	1991	2001	2011
Hilton	273	245	280	315	318	543	891	919	982	1052

All population census figures from the report Historic Census figures Cambridgeshire to 2011 by Cambridgeshire Insight.

In 2011 the parish covered an area of 1,322 acres (535 hectares) and so the population density of Hilton in 2011 was 509.3 persons per square mile (196.6 per square kilometre).

== Landmarks ==
With an entrance from the main village street, Hilton Hall is an English country house dating from the early 17th century but much altered.

On the village green is a turf maze (or labyrinth) some 55 ft (16.5 m) in diameter, one of only eight remaining in England. A stone pillar at its centre records that the maze was cut by William Sparrow (1641–1729) in 1660. The Latin inscriptions, above and below a coat of arms (presumably Sparrow's), reads:

"Sic transit gloria mundi" ("Thus the glory of the world passes away") "Gvlielmvs Sparrow, Gen., natvs ano. 1641. Aetatis svi 88 quando obiit, hos gyros fornavit anno 1660" ("William Sparrow, Gentleman, born in the year 1641. Aged 88 when he died, he formed these circles in the year 1660").

The English inscription reads "William Sparrow departed this life the 25th August, Anno Domini 1729, aged 88 years".

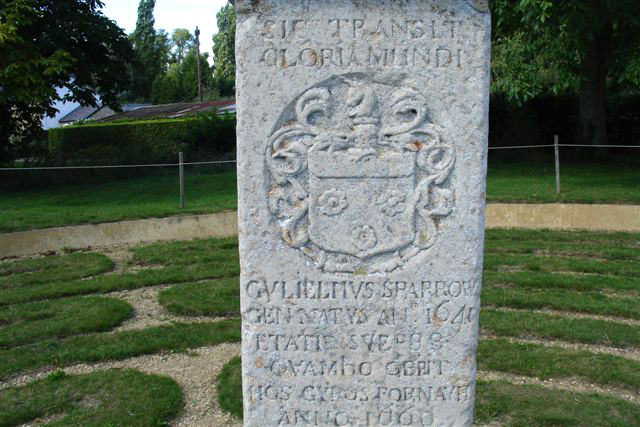
Latin inscription on the central pillar of Hilton turf maze

The design of the maze is similar to the famous pavement labyrinth at Chartres Cathedral, laid in 1235. An illustration by W.H. Matthews in his ‘Mazes and Labyrinths’ (1922) shows several paths leading to the central circle: the erection of the pillar at its centre, some 69 years after it had been cut, could have confused the design, or the paths may simply have become overgrown. Recent maintenance has made the maze conform to the standard medieval pattern.

It has been suggested that the young Sparrow might have recut the maze on the site of an earlier one that had become indistinct from lack of maintenance. There is no evidence to support this theory but the dating of turf mazes is notoriously difficult. There was a turf maze of a similar design in the nearby village of Comberton; that maze was called the Mazles but it no longer exists.

== Notable residents ==
- The writer David Garnett, his wife, Angelica Garnett, and his daughter, Amaryllis Garnett, lived at Hilton Hall.

== In popular culture ==
In E. M. Forster's 1910 novel Howards End, the primary residence of the Wilcox family is in Hilton. The author was also part of the Bloomsbury Group, which may explain why the village is chosen as a key place in his novel.
