= Amaryllis Garnett =

English actress and diarist (1943–1973)

- Born: 17 October 1943; St Pancras, London, England
- Died: 6 May 1973 (aged 29); River Thames at Chelsea, London, England
- Parents: David Garnett (1892–1981) (father); Angelica Bell (1918–2012) (mother)
- Relatives: Henrietta Garnett (1945–2019), sister

Amaryllis Virginia Garnett (17 October 1943 – 6 May 1973) was an English actress and diarist.

== Early life and family ==
Born in St Pancras, London, Garnett was the eldest of the four daughters of David and Angelica Garnett. Her father was a writer, her mother an artist. Her maternal grandparents were the artists Duncan Grant and Vanessa Bell, the sister of Virginia Woolf, making Woolf her great-aunt.

Her father's parents were Edward Garnett, a publisher and writer, and Constance Garnett (née Black), a prolific translator of Russian literature. Her great-grandparents included Richard Garnett, author and librarian, Leslie Stephen, biographer, and Julia Duckworth, a pre-Raphaelite artists' model and niece of the photographer Julia Margaret Cameron.

In 1946 T. H. White, a friend of Amaryllis Garnett's parents, wrote his book Mistress Masham's Repose for her, which for White became the beginning of a new career as a children's writer. A biographer of White notes that in the book "Children are never told that their elders are better than they are or taught Algebra, just Oeconomy, Natural History, and other subjects dealing with life, a situation which would doubtless have delighted Amaryllis Garnett."

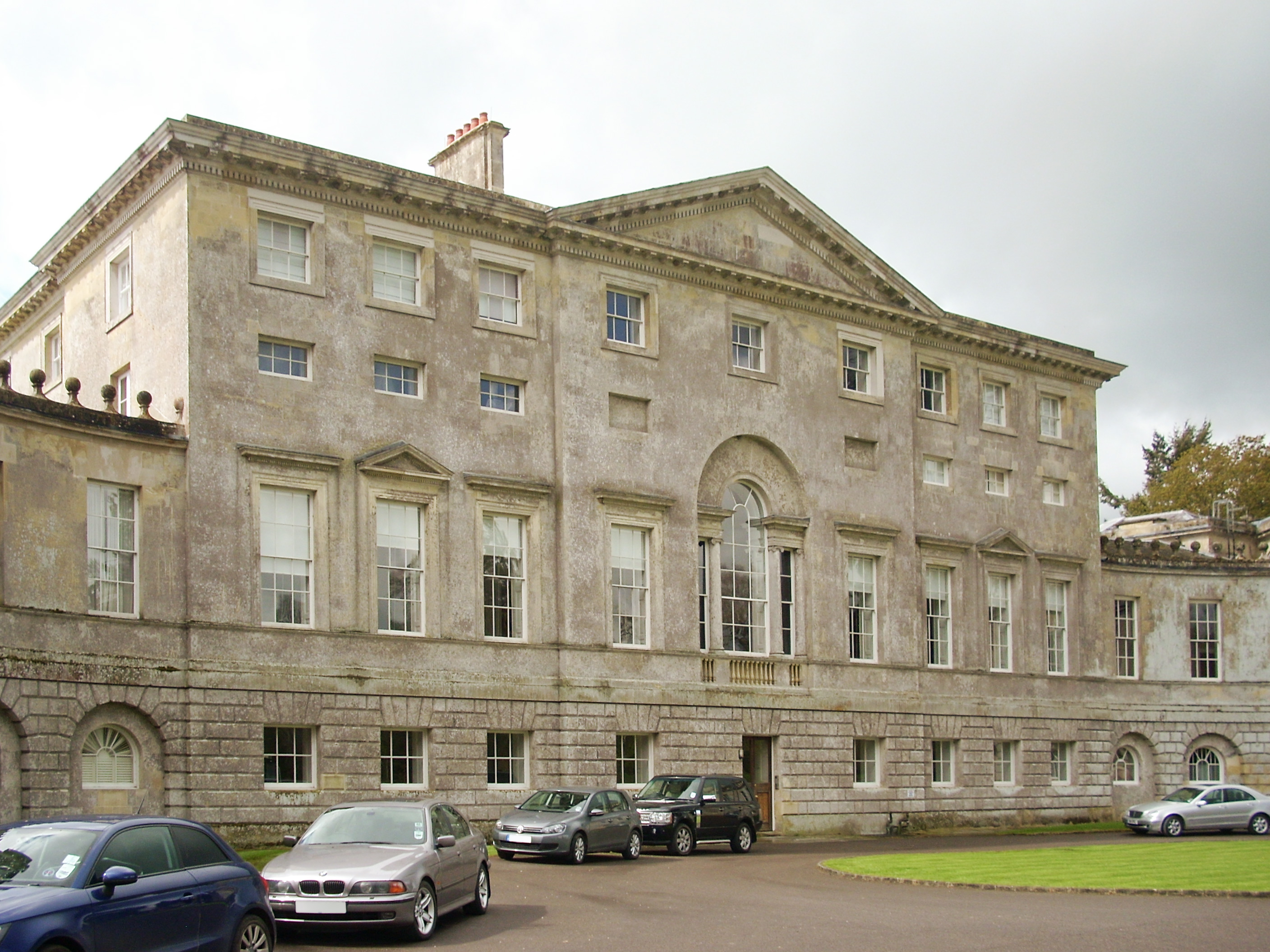
Cranborne Chase School, main building

The Garnetts had four daughters, who called their parents "Angelica" and "Bunny" and had an unconventional childhood.

== Education ==
While the family was living at Hilton Hall, near St Ives, Amaryllis, Henrietta, Nerissa, and Fanny were all sent, to the surprise of some, to the co-educational Huntingdon Grammar School, where Amaryllis arrived at the age of eleven. They made few friends there, but took leading parts in school plays and were the most creative pupils. Meanwhile, at home there was a farm, with a herd of Jersey cows, an orchard, a swimming pool, sculptures, and a dovehouse. At the age of sixteen, Garnett went as a boarder to Cranborne Chase School, then trained for an acting career at a drama school in London. In 1962, she appeared in a production of Medea, when a reviewer commented "Amaryllis Garnett, as the Leader of the Chorus, made one listen to what sounded uncannily like Eliot-inspired reflection, not to admire its sonority but to unravel its philosophical implications."

== Career ==
In 1966, Garnett had her first screen role in an ITV Play of the Week written by John Mortimer called A Choice of Kings. In 1967, she joined the Royal Shakespeare Company. As an actress, she was taken up by Harold Pinter, who found her a part in his film The Go-Between (1971). Spotlight 1973 gave her height as 5 feet 8 inches and her eye colour as blue. Her mother described her as "very beautiful and deeply intelligent". In 1969, according to Frances Spalding, she was much admired by Cyril Connolly.

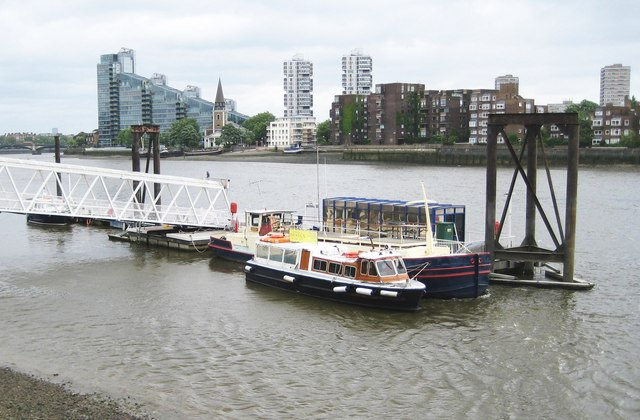
Houseboats at Chelsea

In her late twenties, Garnett was living on a houseboat on the River Thames, moored by Battersea Bridge at Chelsea, which had been bought for her by her parents. However, her life was turbulent, the result of combining a high-spending lifestyle with having no income at all. She decided to give up acting and move to Morocco with a boyfriend, causing her father to complain "Surely she ought to get a job and get on with her profession!" At the age of 29, her life was falling apart.

On an afternoon in May 1973, David Plante and Mark Lancaster took Garnett and her two sisters, all in long dresses, out to a club, where they danced together, while the men watched. A few days later, while suffering from deep depression, Garnett drowned in the river at Chelsea. It was possible that the death was accidental, but the Garnett family believed suicide more likely, and Angelica Garnett told Plante that she had "not been a good mother". Garnett left behind a diary, which remains unpublished.

In her biography of Duncan Grant of 1997, Frances Spalding gives the view that "Amaryllis was a rare combination of character, imagination and friendliness."

== See also ==
- List of unsolved deaths
