= Mistress Masham's Repose =

Book by T. H. White

- First edition (publ. Putnams)
- Author: T. H. White
- Language: English
- Publisher: Putnams
- Publication date: 1946
- LC Class: PZ3.W5854 Mi

Mistress Masham's Repose (1946) is a novel by T. H. White that describes the adventures of a girl who discovers a group of Lilliputians, a race of tiny people from Jonathan Swift's satirical classic Gulliver's Travels. The story is set in Northamptonshire, England, after the Second World War, but there is a strong flavour of the 18th century, both the fictional land of Lilliput and the British Empire of Swift, Gibbon, and Pope. Imperialism, and the need for self-governance, is a major theme in the novel.

== Plot ==
Maria, a ten-year-old orphaned girl, is nominal owner of the grand but impoverished country estate on which she lives. Her only friends are a loving family cook and a retired professor, who try to protect Maria from her strict governess, Miss Brown. The governess makes her miserable, taking her cue from her (Maria's) guardian, a vicar named Mr. Hater. Miss Brown and Mr. Hater conspire to keep Maria poor and isolated, hoping eventually to steal her inheritance. Maria does not go to school, and in church she has to walk all the way to her seat in oversized football boots which make a great deal of noise. Shy, lonely, and starved of affection, she meets a colony of Lilliputians living on an island in an ornamental lake. Her relations with them are initially quite strained: she tries to win them over with gifts while imposing her own ill-considered plans upon them, but eventually learns that she must respect them as her equals. Learning of the Lilliputians' existence, her guardians try to exploit them for gain, but working together Maria and her friends thwart their evil plans. The estate is restored to its former glory and becomes the Lilliputians' permanent home.

== Setting ==
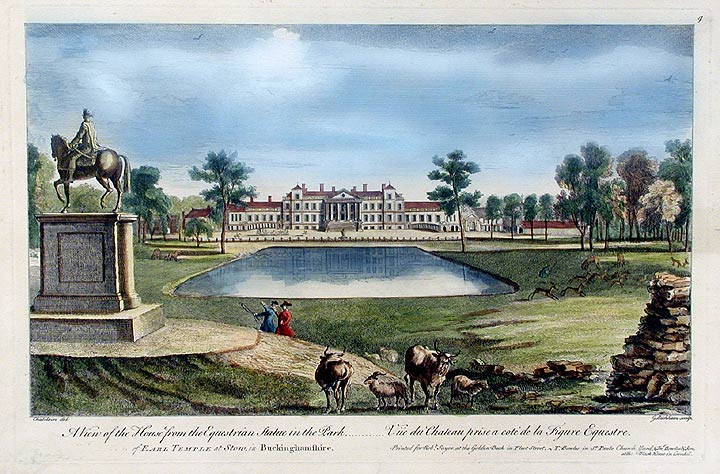
Stowe House, an inspiration for Malplaquet

The story has a contemporary setting, after the Second World War; someone wants to talk to Churchill, but it is revealed Clement Attlee is the prime minister, and in one chapter Maria plays at being General Eisenhower greeting grateful subject peoples.

As the end-paper illustrations in the book show, the ruinous estate of Malplaquet has similarities with Stowe in Buckinghamshire, where White had taught at Stowe School during the 1930s, while the house is more like Blenheim Palace, the residence of the Dukes of Marlborough. The name is an allusion to Blenheim which depends upon knowing that the Battle of Blenheim was the first of the great Marlborough's major victories, while Malplaquet was his fourth and last. The titular Repose is a tiny forgotten island in the middle of an ornamental lake in the vast grounds of Malplaquet. A structure on it is occupied by descendants of the Lilliputians, brought to England two centuries earlier by a sea-captain, following their discovery by Lemuel Gulliver. The island provides the perfect setting for their timid and secretive civilisation, accessible only by boat and protected by a wall of brambles which is carefully cultivated by the island's occupants. Many of the monuments in the grounds of Malplaquet recall notable figures of the early 18th century; Mistress Masham's Repose itself commemorates Abigail Masham, a close confidante of Queen Anne. Although she has no other bearing on the story, she was a cousin of Sarah Churchill, Duchess of Marlborough, thus providing another link between the fictional Palace of Malplaquet and the real Blenheim Palace. Blenheim and Stowe are in turn linked to each other, in that Richard Temple, 1st Viscount Cobham, who developed the house and gardens at Stowe in the early eighteenth century, was a notable soldier who had served under the Duke of Marlborough.

== Editions ==
The book was first published in the U.S. by Putnams, appearing in 1946. In the United Kingdom, the publisher was Jonathan Cape, and the first British edition is dated 1947, reprinted in 1963, 1972, 1979, and 2000.

In 1989 a large de-luxe edition was published by the Folio Society, illustrated by Charles Stewart, with a red silk moiré cover.

The book went out of print in 2009, but was republished by Red Fox Books in 2011.

In the United States, the book was out of print for many years until being re-issued by The New York Review Children's Collection.

== Dedication and reception ==
Mistress Masham's Repose was written for Amaryllis Garnett, the first child of White's friends David and Angelica Garnett, and is dedicated to her.

The fantasy author Terry Pratchett said of the book: "It has always been a favourite of mine. This book is one for the hall of fame".

== Cancelled film adaptation ==
Joe Hale, the producer of The Black Cauldron (1985), began development on a film adaptation at Disney and had Andreas Deja to do preliminary artwork for it. While Roy E. Disney was supportive of the project, Jeffrey Katzenberg disliked it and halted any attempt for it to be greenlit.
