= Vermandel =

Vermandel is a surname. Notable people with the surname include:

- Eva Vermandel (born 1974), Belgian photographer
- René Vermandel (1893–1958), Belgian cyclist
