= Anne Olivier Bell =

English art scholar

Anne Olivier Bell MBE
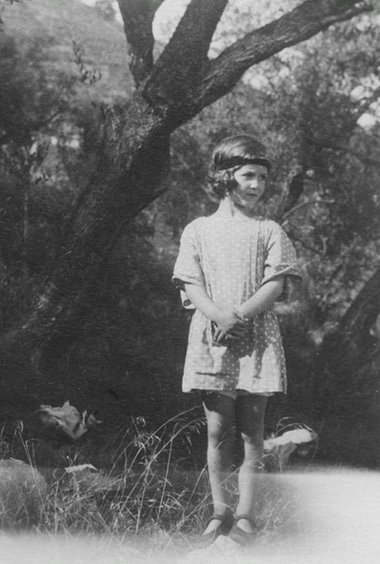
- Portrait of Bell in Italy, circa 1923
- Born: Anne Olivier Popham; 22 June 1916; London, England
- Died: 18 July 2018 (aged 102); Firle, England
- Occupations: Art scholar, editor
- Spouse: Quentin Bell (b. 1910, d. 1996)
- Relatives: Virginia Nicholson (daughter); Cressida Bell (daughter); Julian Bell (son)
- Writing career
- Period: 1945—1947 (Monuments Men); 1972–1984 (editor)
- Subject: Bloomsbury Group

Anne Olivier Bell MBE (née Popham; 22 June 1916 – 18 July 2018) was an English art scholar. She was part of the Bloomsbury Group and best known for editing the diaries of Virginia Woolf. As a member of the Monuments Men, she was responsible for the protection of cultural artefacts in Europe during the Second World War and earned the military rank of Major.

== Early life ==
Anne Olivier Popham was born in London to Arthur Popham, an expert in Italian art, and Brynhild, daughter of Sydney Olivier, 1st Baron Olivier and a cousin of Laurence Olivier.

Anne Popham had two brothers. Her parents divorced in 1924. After her mother's remarriage to F. R. G. N. Sherrard, she moved with them to Dorset. Her mother had three more children with Sherrard.

Anne Pophams's mother died in 1935, after which she lived with her father. She attended St Paul's Girls' School, then went to Germany to train as an opera singer. Unsuccessful in this, she returned to London to join the Central School of Speech and Drama. Her audition for the Royal Albert Hall failed, and she enrolled at the Courtauld Institute.

In 1937, she was in Paris for the World's Fair, where she met and had a relationship with Graham Bell. He painted a portrait of her, which is now at the Tate Museum.

After the Second World War, Popham met Quentin Bell, who asked her to model for him. They married in 1952. In 1967, they moved to Cobbe Place in Beddingham, when Bell was made Professor of Art History and Theory at the University of Sussex. The couple had three children, two daughters and a son.

== Career ==
=== Second World War ===
Popham was compiling a study of Rubens as a research associate of a German historian in London when the war broke out. Her employer was interned and she joined the Ministry of Information, working with Laurie Lee. She was a research assistant in the photographs division and then in the publications department, where she published documentation on the British war effort. She was also an air raid warden in London.

In 1945, Popham became one of the Monuments Men, seeking to prevent the destruction of cultural artefacts in Germany, and to restore artworks stolen by the Nazis. She travelled to Bünde, the only female member of the programme and the only civilian, albeit with a rank of major. While the men sought out hidden art, she was responsible for organisation and documentation.

Popham invited Franz Wolff-Metternich, a curator of historical monuments and an art professor, to the officers' club. She wanted to discuss the restitution of stolen artworks to museums, but her colleagues refused to dine with him. She was to become unpopular with her colleagues for her willingness to socialise with the Germans.

Anne Bell's diaries of her time with the Monument Men are now at the Imperial War Museum archives.

A detailed wartime biography of Maj. Anne Bell's contribution to the MFAA, as well as her pre and post war life, is maintained by the Monuments Men Foundation for the Preservation of Art.

=== Arts Council ===
Anne Popham joined the Arts Council in 1947. She was responsible for the publication of exhibition catalogues. She also escorted paintings from the Alte Pinakothek in Munich for an exhibition at the National Gallery, London.

=== Virginia Woolf ===
Anne Bell assisted her husband, Quentin Bell, in his monumental biography of Virginia Woolf by compiling index cards for each month of her life, and copying Leonard Woolf's diaries. The biography was published to acclaim in 1972. Anne Bell then edited the diaries of Virginia Woolf, publishing them in five volumes starting in 1977.

She then published a book Editing Virginia Woolf's Diary, detailing her work as editor.

Anne Olivier Bell received honorary doctorates from the University of Sussex and University of York. In 1984, she was elected as a Fellow of the Royal Society of Literature.

=== Charleston ===
The Charleston Farmhouse was the country seat of the Bloomsbury group. After the death of Duncan Grant in 1978, Anne was instrumental in establishing a charitable trust to preserve the property. The artistic influence of the Bloomsbury group was fading by then, and the farmhouse itself was in a poor state of repair. It took six years of fundraising to monetise the trust.

Charleston became open to the public in the 1980s, presented in the period style of the Bloomsbury group. Till her death, she was the president of the trust. She was also an expert on the artworks preserved there, and an editor of Canvas, the publication of the Friends of Charleston.

== Later life ==
While the British government did not initially acknowledge the efforts of the Monument Men, the US established a foundation to recognise them, and Anne Bell was lauded in 2007 for her contributions. She received an MBE in the New Year's Honours list of 2014 for services to Literature and the Arts.

Anne Bell's 2013 portrait by Eva Vermandel resides in the permanent collection of London's National Portrait Gallery.

Anne Bell lived with her husband in Firle, East Sussex. Her husband Quentin died in 1996. Anne Olivier Bell died on 18 July 2018, aged 102.

== Selected works ==
- Anne Olivier Bell, ed. (1979). The Diary of Virginia Woolf, Volume 1: 1915–1919. ISBN 978-0156260367.
- Anne Olivier Bell, ed. (1980). The Diary of Virginia Woolf, Volume 2: 1920–1924. Penguin. ISBN 978-0140052831.
- Anne Olivier Bell, ed. (1981). The Diary of Virginia Woolf, Volume 3: 1925–1930. ISBN 978-0156260381.
- Anne Olivier Bell, ed. (1983). The Diary of Virginia Woolf, Volume 4: 1931–1935. ISBN 978-0156260398.
- Anne Olivier Bell, ed. (1985). The Diary of Virginia Woolf, Volume 5: 1936–1941. Harcourt, Brace, Jovanovich. ISBN 978-0156260404.
- Anne Olivier Bell (1990). Editing Virginia Woolf's Diary. The Bloomsbury Workshop. ISBN 978-0951681305.
