= Château de Charry =

Castle in Occitania, France

Coordinates: 44°20′23″N 1°12′37″E

The Château de Charry is a castle, originally 15th century, in the commune of Montcuq in the Lot département of France.

The castle was built in three stages. It was initially a keep whose principal masonry was flanked by two polygonal towers. It was encircled by a fortified curtain wall; the remains of this are the third tower, though not connected to the main building, and a rectangular barbican. Cannon positions defended access to the well. An underground passage linked the barbican to one of the towers of the keep.

In the 17th century, a second period of building added the central building to the right of the tower and buildings forming the court.

In the 19th century, the main building was joined to the round tower of the ramparts. This keep provided a firing line between Montcuq and the keep at Marcilhac, and guaranteed the defence of the Charry valley.

The castle is privately owned. It has been listed since 1976 as a monument historique by the French Ministry of Culture.

David Garnett, the British writer and publisher and a prominent member of the Bloomsbury Group, moved to France and lived in a house in the grounds of the Château de Charry after his separation from his wife, Angelica. He died there in 1981.

== See also ==
- List of castles in France
