= Angelica Bell =

Angelica Bell is the name of:

- Angellica Bell (born 1976), British television and radio presenter
- Angelica Garnett (née Bell) (1918–2012), English writer and painter associated with the Bloomsbury Group
