= Three Days in the Village =

Short story by Leo Tolstoy

"Three Days in the Village" ("Три дня в деревне") is a short story by Leo Tolstoy written in 1909, one year before Tolstoy's death. Although classified as fiction, it is autobiographical in nature and details Tolstoy's life on his estate and his travels to nearby villages, and the contrasts between the two. It was translated by Louise Maude and Aylmer Maude.

== Material ==
In one of the more moving passages, Tolstoy details how he had visited a dying peasant who was so poor that he had neither a bed nor a pillow to die on. Others at the Westminster Review in 1911 had similarly agreed about the deplorable destitution of the peasants, as depicted in this work. In a 1911 review by The Spectator, stated that the story was little more than a few pages from Tolstoy's diary, detailing his daily life and "his conversations with his village friends and with the tramps and beggars who gather at his door, and his reflections upon them."

According to famed author Edward Garnett, in this work, Tolstoy says that society needs to abolish "land-slavery," that town workers are not free, and that the interests of the workers and the rich, ruling classes were completely separate. According to literary critic Viktor Shklovsky, this work was an example of how the great Russian author had both started and ended his writing career with "documental prose."

== See also ==
- Bibliography of Leo Tolstoy
- Singing In The Village
