= Hilton Hall, Cambridgeshire =

English country house

Coordinates: 52.2803°N 0.1092°W

Hilton Hall is an early 17th-century English country house in the village of Hilton in Cambridgeshire. The hall is listed Grade II* on the National Heritage List for England. The dovecote in the grounds of the hall is listed Grade II.

== Description ==
With an entrance onto the village High Street in Hilton, in the district of Huntingdonshire, the hall is a brick-built gentleman's house first built in the early 17th century. It has three storeys, and the ground plan takes the shape of a letter T. The front elevation has an 18th-century facade. The roof is tiled, with a parapet and parapet gables and with chimney stacks with recessed panels. Inside is a magnificent early 17th-century oak staircase with six flights of steps. The beams are moulded, with decorated stops, and in the hall is 18th-century panelling. A 20th-century one-storey extension to the rear of the house also has 18th-century panelling, which came from the nearby Park Farm when it was demolished.

Standing to the south of the main house is a fine square dovehouse with a hipped pyramid roof, believed to date from the late 17th century.

An article in Country Life magazine in 2001 notes that "The original position of the windows in the 17th century is entirely lost under the mid-18th-century rearrangement, with the bizarre structural result that internally beams run into the lintels of the main windows".

From the village street, the main entrance has two red brick gate piers with ball finials and wrought iron gates (dated 1845) giving onto a forecourt.

== Residents ==
According to one account, Hilton Hall was built for Robert Walpole, gentleman, who still owned it when he died in 1699 aged 100.

The house has strong connections with the Bloomsbury Group. In 1924 it was acquired by the writer David Garnett, and he lived there until the 1960s, initially with his first wife, Ray Marshall (1891–1940), sister of Frances Partridge, and later with his second wife, Angelica Garnett, daughter of Duncan Grant and Vanessa Bell.

In 2001 the house was still lived in by Richard Garnett, son of the writer, and his wife.
