= Frances Partridge =

English writer and translator

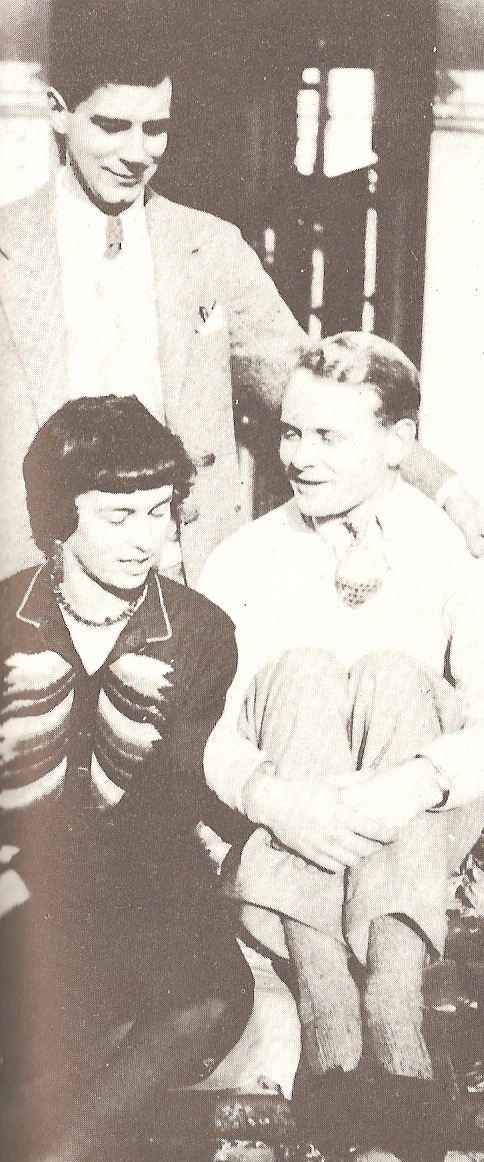
Raymond Mortimer, Frances Partridge (then Marshall), and Dadie Rylands

Frances Catherine Partridge CBE (née Marshall; 15 March 1900 – 5 February 2004) was an English writer. Closely connected to the Bloomsbury Group, she is probably best known for the publication of her diaries. She married Ralph Partridge (1894 – 30 November 1960) in 1933. The couple had one son, (Lytton) Burgo Partridge (1935–1963).

== Origins and education ==
Born in Bedford Square in London, she was the youngest of six children of William Marshall, an English architect and losing finalist at the first of the Wimbledon Tennis Championships in 1877, and Margaret Anna Lloyd, a suffragist who took the 6-year-old Frances to a protest. She lived in the square until she was eight when her father retired and they moved to the countryside. She was educated at Bedales School and Newnham College, Cambridge.

== Bloomsbury ==
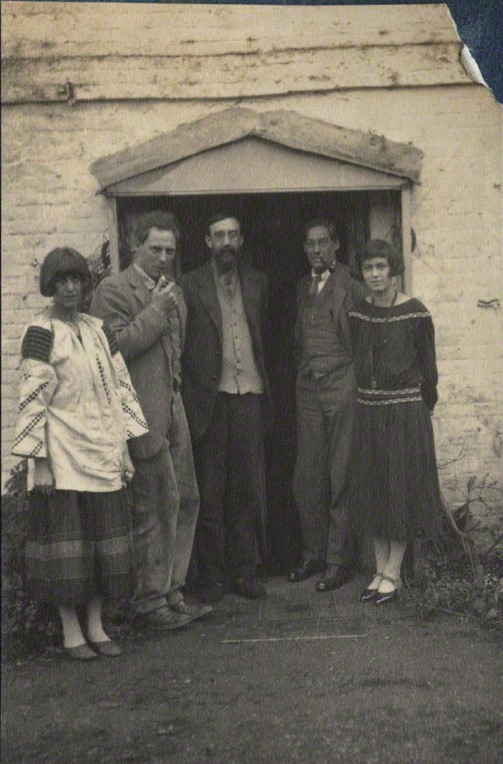
Dora Carrington, Ralph Partridge, Lytton and Oliver Strachey, and Frances Partridge, 1923

While working at a London bookshop owned by David Garnett (whose first wife was Frances's sister Rachel Marshall, known as Ray) and Francis Birrell, Frances Partridge got to know Lytton Strachey, Dora Carrington, and Ralph Partridge. In 1921, Ralph Partridge had married Dora Carrington, who was in love with Lytton Strachey, a homosexual who was himself more interested in Partridge. An added complication was Dora Carrington's intermittent affair with one of Partridge's best friends, Gerald Brenan. Carrington, Partridge, and Strachey shared a Wiltshire farm-house, Ham Spray, in a complex triangular relationship (later recorded in the 1995 film Carrington, with Alex Kingston playing Frances).

Ralph Partridge now fell in love with Frances. They lived in London during the week and repaired to Ham Spray at weekends. After Dora Carrington committed suicide out of grief in 1932, shortly after Lytton Strachey's death, Ralph and Frances married on 2 March 1933. They lived at Ham Spray until Ralph's death in 1960.

They had one son, (Lytton) Burgo Partridge, who was born in 1935 and named after Strachey. In 1962, Burgo married Henrietta Garnett, daughter of Angelica Garnett and David Garnett, with Henrietta already pregnant with their daughter. He died suddenly of heart failure on 7 September 1963, only three weeks after the birth of their baby, Sophie Vanessa. He had already been noticed for his writing ability, and had published one well-received book, A History of Orgies (1958).

Frances sold Ham Spray and moved to London. Her writings, her membership of the Bloomsbury circle, her great personal charm and the energy that she retained into extreme old age together ensured for her a degree of celebrity towards the end of her life.

She was appointed a Commander of the Order of the British Empire in the Millennium New Year Honours.

== Works ==
- The Greville Memoirs (Macmillan & Co, 1938), an editorial co-operation with Ralph Partridge (commenced by Lytton Strachey).
- A translation of Nothing is Impossible (Harvill Press, 1956) by Mercedes Ballesteros.
- A translation of Something to Declare (The Harvill Press, 1957) by Lovleff Bornet
- A translation of Blood and Sand (Elek, 1958) by Vicente Blasco Ibáñez
- A translation of The Naked Lady (Elek, 1959) by Vicente Blasco Ibáñez
- A translation of The Enemy in the Mouth: An Account of Alcoholics Anonymous (Rupert Hart-Davis, 1961) by Joseph Kessel
- A translation of A Gap in the Wall (Collins, 1963) by Gabrielle Estivals
- A translation of El Señor Presidente (Atheneum, 1964) by Miguel Ángel Asturias
- A translation of Human Communication (World University Library, 1967) by J.L.Aranguren
- A translation of Napoleon's St. Helena (John Murray, 1968) by Gilbert Martineau
- A translation of The War of Time (Gollancz, 1970) by Alejo Carpentier
- A translation of Napoleon Surrenders (John Murray, 1971) by Gilbert Martineau
- A translation of Reasons of State (Alfred A Knopf, 1976) by Alejo Carpentier
- A translation of Napoleon's Last Journey (John Murray, 1976) by Gilbert Martineau
- A translation of Madame Mère: Napoleon’s Mother (John Murray, 1978) by Gilbert Martineau
- A Pacifist's War (Hogarth Press, 1978), an account of Ralph's and her life as pacifists during the Second World War. (Ralph Partridge had won a Military Cross and bar during the First World War.)
- Love in Bloomsbury: Memories (Victor Gollancz, 1981)
- Julia (Gollancz, 1983), a memoir of her friend Julia Strachey.
- Everything to Lose (Gollancz, 1985), her diaries between 1945 and 1960.
- Friends in Focus (Chatto & Windus, 1987), collected photographs.
- Hanging On (Collins, 1990), her diaries between 1960 and 1963.
- Other People (HarperCollins, 1993), her diaries between 1963 and 1966.
- Good Company (HarperCollins, 1994), her diaries between 1967 and 1970.
- Life Regained (Weidenfeld & Nicolson, 1998), her diaries between 1970 and 1972.
- Ups and Downs (Weidenfeld & Nicolson, 2001), her diaries between 1972 and 1975.

== In popular culture ==
- Alex Kingston portrays Partridge in the 1995 British biographical film Carrington, written and directed by Christopher Hampton based on the book Lytton Strachey by Michael Holroyd.
- Sauce Ena portrays Partridge in the 2003 Goya Award winning Spanish film Al sur de Granada written and directed by Fernando Colomo based on the 1957 autobiographical book South from Granada by Gerald Brenan.

== Sources ==
- Daily Telegraph obituary
- Guardian obituary
- Independent obituary
