= Clive Bell =

English art critic (1881–1964)

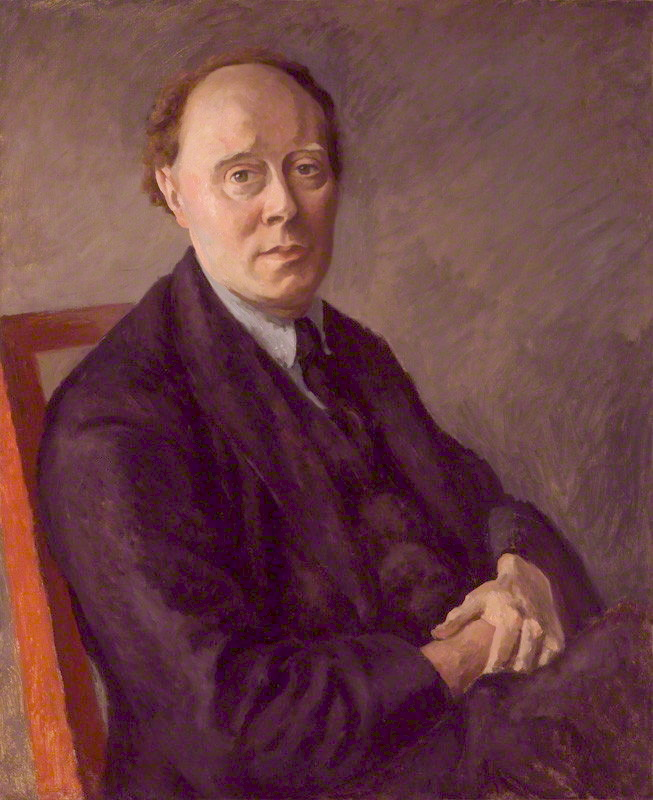
- Portrait by Roger Fry (c. 1924)
- Born: 16 September 1881; East Shefford, Berkshire, England
- Died: 17 September 1964 (aged 83); London, England
- Education: Marlborough College; Trinity College, Cambridge
- Occupation: Art critic
- Spouse: Vanessa Stephen (m. 1907)
- Children: Julian Bell; Quentin Bell; Angelica Bell
- Relatives: Virginia Woolf (sister-in-law); Cressida Bell (granddaughter); Virginia Bell (granddaughter)
- Writing career
- Period: 20th century
- Genre: Art criticism

Arthur Clive Heward Bell (16 September 1881 – 17 September 1964) was an English art critic, associated with formalism and the Bloomsbury Group. He developed the art theory known as significant form.

== Biography ==
=== Early life and education ===
Bell was born in East Shefford, Berkshire, in 1881, the third of four children of William Heward Bell (1849–1927) and Hannah Taylor Cory (1850–1942). He had an elder brother (Cory), an elder sister (Lorna, Mrs Acton), and a younger sister (Dorothy, Mrs Hony). His father was a civil engineer who built his fortune in the family coal mines at Merthyr Tydfil in Wales – "a family which drew its wealth from Welsh mines and expended it on the destruction of wild animals." They lived at Cleeve House, Seend, near Devizes, Wiltshire, where Squire Bell's many hunting trophies were displayed.

Bell was educated at Marlborough College and at Trinity College, Cambridge, studying history. In 1902 he gained an Earl of Derby scholarship to study in Paris, where his interest in art began.

=== Marriage and other liaisons ===
On returning to London early in 1907, he met and married Vanessa Stephen, the artist sister of Virginia Woolf. They had two sons, Julian (1908–1937) and Quentin (1910–1996), who both became writers. Julian joined the Republican side in the Spanish Civil War as an ambulance driver and was killed by an enemy shell, aged 29.

By World War I their marriage was over. Vanessa had begun a lifelong relationship with Duncan Grant, and Clive had a number of liaisons with other women including Mary Hutchinson, wife of St John Hutchinson. However, Clive and Vanessa never officially separated or divorced. Not only did they visit each other regularly, they also sometimes spent holidays together and paid "family" visits to Clive's parents. Clive lived in London but often spent long periods at Charleston Farmhouse, Sussex, where Vanessa lived with Duncan and her three children by Clive and Duncan. He supported her wish to have a child by Duncan and allowed his wife's only daughter, Angelica, to bear his surname.

Vanessa's daughter by Duncan, Angelica Garnett (1918–2012, née Bell), was raised as Clive's daughter until she married. She was informed by her mother, just prior to her marriage and shortly after her brother Julian's death, that Duncan Grant was her biological father. This deception forms the central message of her memoir, Deceived with Kindness (1984).

According to historian Stanley Rosenbaum, "Bell may, indeed, be the least liked member of Bloomsbury.... Bell has been found wanting by biographers and critics of the Group – as a husband, a father, and especially a brother-in-law. It is undeniable that he was a wealthy snob, hedonist, and womaniser, a racist and an anti-Semite (but not a homophobe), who changed from a liberal socialist and pacifist into a reactionary appeaser. Bell's reputation has led to his being underestimated in the history of Bloomsbury...."

=== Significant form ===
Soon after Bell met Roger Fry, he developed his art theory significant form. The two shared a passion for contemporary French art. Bell's book Art (1914) was the first publication of his theory, which he describes as "lines and colours combined in a particular way, certain forms, and relations of forms, that stir our aesthetic emotions." This form can be seen in art created by many members of the Bloomsbury Group, an example being Interior at Gordon Square by Duncan Grant.

== Political views ==
Bell was at one point an adherent of absolute pacifism, and during the First World War was a conscientious objector, allowed to perform Work of National Importance by assisting on the farm of Philip Morrell MP, at Garsington Manor. In his 1938 pamphlet War Mongers, he opposed any attempt by Britain to use military force, arguing "the worst tyranny is better than the best war." Ideas that Bell eventually supported the war are unproven, as Mark Hussey points out in his 2021 biography of Bell (p. 350 n1).

== Works ==
- Art (1914)
- Pot-boilers (1918)
- Since Cézanne (1922)
- Civilization (1928)
- Proust (1929)
- An Account of French Painting (1931)
- Enjoying Pictures (1934)
- Old Friends (1956)

== See also ==
- List of Bloomsbury Group people

== Sources ==
- Bell, Clive (2015) [1914]. Art. CreateSpace Independent Publishing Platform. ISBN 9781514244715.
- Text of Art Gutenberg Project
- Bywater, William G (1975). Clive Bell's Eye. Detroit: Wayne State University Press. ISBN 9780814315347.
