= Burgo Partridge =

British writer

Lytton Burgo Partridge (8 June 1935 – 7 September 1963) was an English author and member of the Bloomsbury Group.

He was the son of Ralph Partridge and Frances Marshall, and named after Lytton Strachey. In 1962, Burgo married Henrietta Garnett, daughter of Angelica Garnett and David Garnett. At the wedding, seventeen-year-old Henrietta was already pregnant with their daughter. Burgo died suddenly of heart failure on 7 September 1963, only three weeks after the birth of their baby, Sophie Vanessa. He had already been noticed for his writing ability, and had published one well-received book, A History of Orgies (1958), which was a financial success for himself and his publisher Anthony Blond.

== See also ==
- List of Bloomsbury Group people
