= Singing In The Village =

Short story by Leo Tolstoy

"Singing In The Village" ("Песни на деревне") is a short story by Leo Tolstoy written in 1909 and published in 1910. While classified as a short story, translator and biographer Aylmer Maude described the piece as a sketch. According to The Spectator in 1910, the story details "...the incidents of his daily life, his conversations with his village friends and with the tramps and beggars who gather at his door, and his reflections upon them."

== History ==
It was published as part of "Three Days in the Village, and Other Sketches", as translated by Louise Maude and Aylmer Maude.

== See also ==
- Bibliography of Leo Tolstoy
- Three Days in the Village
