= Gilbert Martineau =

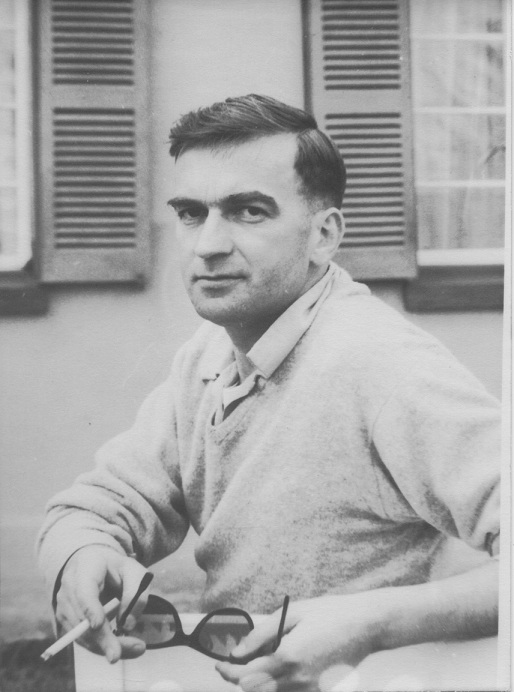

Gilbert Martineau (1918 – 23 August 1995, in La Rochelle) was a French naval officer, author of books on Napoleon and his family, honorary consul, and curator 1956-1987 of the French properties on St Helena, where Napoleon had been in exile.

== History ==
An anglophile, he was living in London when war broke out in 1939, and he joined the Free French in 1940. His wartime service included a period on a British submarine, and service in Mauritania. On demobilization in 1945 he joined the French Naval Reserve, and was called back into the service in 1954-1955. After the war he worked as Director of Publications for Nagel.

In 1956 he decided to take up an appointment on the remote British Island of St Helena as honorary consul and curator of the French properties, a position which he held until 1987. He continued to live at Longwood House for the rest of his life. As well as devoting himself to the restoration of the properties, he was also a prolific author. He died in La Rochelle in 1995.

== Works ==
- Napoléon à Sainte-Hélène - Tallandier, Paris - Prix Marie-Eugène Simon-Henri-Martin bestowed by the Académie française
- La Vie Quotidienne À Sainte-Hélène Au Temps De Napoléon - translated as Napoleon's St. Helena (John Murray, 1968) by Frances Partridge
- Napoléon se Rend Aux Anglais - Hachette, Paris. Prix du Cercle de l'Union - translated as Napoleon Surrenders (John Murray, 1971) by Frances Partridge
- Napoléon et l'Empire - ouvrage collectif, Hachette
- Sainte-Hélène - éditions Rencontre, Lausanne
- Le Retour des Cendres - translated as Napoleon's Last Journey (John Murray, 1976) by Frances Partridge
- Madame Mere - éditions France-Empire, Paris - translated as Madame Mere: Napoleon’s Mother (John Murray, 1978) by Frances Partridge
- Le Roi de Rome - édition France-Empire
- Marie-Louise, Impératrice des Français - édition France-Empire
- L’Entente Cordiale - édition France-Empire
- Pauline Bonaparte, Princesse Borghese - édition France-Empire
- Lord Byron. La Malédiction Du Génie - Tallandier
- Lucien Bonaparte, Prince De Canino - édition France-Empire
- Caroline Bonaparte, Princesse Murat, Reine de Naples - édition France-Empire
