= Significant form =

Art theory developed by Clive Bell

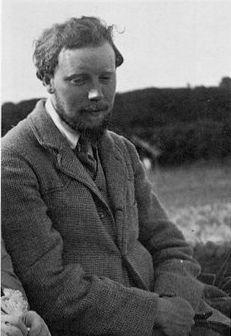
Clive Bell

Significant form is an aesthetic theory developed by English art critic Clive Bell which specified a set of criteria for what qualified as a work of art. In his 1914 book, Art, Bell postulated that for an object to be deemed a work of art it required potential to provoke aesthetic emotion in its viewer, a quality he termed "significant form." Bell's definition explicitly separated significant form from beauty; in order to possess significant form, an object need not be attractive as long as it elicits an emotional response.

As Bell put it succinctly: "The important thing about a picture, however, is not how it is painted, but whether it provokes aesthetic emotion."

Semir Zeki, the neurobiologist, has written that the term "significant configuration" may be a better choice since, by Bell's definition, "significant form" is restricted to lines and colours whereas "significant configuration" is broader and may include features such as faces or bodies which must have a significant configuration to be recognized as such.

== Sources ==
- Text of Art Gutenberg Project
