= Frances Spalding =

British art historian (born 1950)

Frances Spalding CBE FRSL

Personal details
- Born: Frances Crabtree; 16 July 1950 (age 76)
- Spouse: Julian Spalding (m. 1974; div. 1991)
- Education: University of Nottingham
- Occupation: Art historian and writer

Frances Spalding (née Crabtree; born 16 July 1950) is a British art historian, writer and a former editor of The Burlington Magazine.

== Life ==
Frances Crabtree studied at the University of Nottingham and gained her PhD for a study of Roger Fry. She taught art history at Sheffield City Polytechnic (1978–1988) before becoming a freelance writer and curator. She returned to academic work to take up the post of lecturer in art history at Newcastle University in 2000. She was promoted to reader in 20th Century British Art in 2002 and appointed Professor of Art History in 2007.

Spalding became the Editor of The Burlington Magazine in September 2015, leaving in August 2016. From 2016 to 2018, she was a fellow of Clare Hall, Cambridge, and an affiliate lecturer of the Department of History of Art, University of Cambridge.

Spalding specialises in 20th-century British art, biography and cultural history and her work includes essays, criticism and reviews. She curated the 2003 exhibition John Piper in the 1930s: Abstraction on the Beach at Dulwich Picture Gallery in south London. She has also written a study of poet Stevie Smith and a biography of John and Myfanwy Piper. When reviewing John Piper, Myfanwy Piper: Lives in Art, The Independent said of Spalding: "At her scintillating best, she is both a brilliant encapsulator and shrewd summer-up; above all, an enthusiast and advocate whose wisdom makes you eager for her subject."

Spalding was elected a Fellow of the Royal Society of Literature in 1984. She was appointed as Commander of the Order of the British Empire (CBE) in the Birthday Honours 2005 for services to literature. She is a trustee of the Charleston Trust.

In 1974, Crabtree married Julian Spalding; the couple divorced in 1991.

== Selected publications ==
- Magnificent Dreams: Burne-Jones and the Late Victorians (1978)
- Whistler (1979)
- Vanessa Bell (1979, ISBN 0 2977 8162 6)
- Roger Fry: Art and Life (1980)
- — (2016) [1983]. Vanessa Bell: Portrait of the Bloomsbury Artist. I.B.Tauris. ISBN 978-1-78453-241-3.
- British Art since 1900 (1986)
- Stevie Smith: A Critical Biography (1988)
- 20th Century Painters and Sculptors: Dictionary of British Art (1990)
- Dance Till the Stars Come Down: A Biography of John Minton (1991)
- Virginia Woolf: Paper Darts: the Illustrated Letters (ed) (1991)
- Duncan Grant: A Biography (1997)
- The Tate: A History (1998)
- Ravilious in Public: A Guide to Works by the Artist in Public Collections (2002)
- John Piper in the 1930s: Abstraction on the Beach (2003)
- Gwen Raverat: Friends, Family and Affections (2001)
- The Bloomsbury Group, National Portrait Gallery Insights (2005)
- John Piper, Myfanwy Piper: Lives in Art, Oxford University Press (2009, ISBN 978-0-19-956761-4)

=== Reviews ===
- Spalding, Frances (June 2011). "The contemporaneous past: reviving native traditions, in modern ways". Australian Book Review. 332: 16–17.
- Review of: Harris, Alexandra (2010). Romantic moderns: English writers, artists and the imagination from Virginia Woolf to John Piper. Thames & Hudson. ISBN 9780500251713.
