= Vanessa Bell =

British painter, designer and member of the Bloomsbury Group (1879–1961)

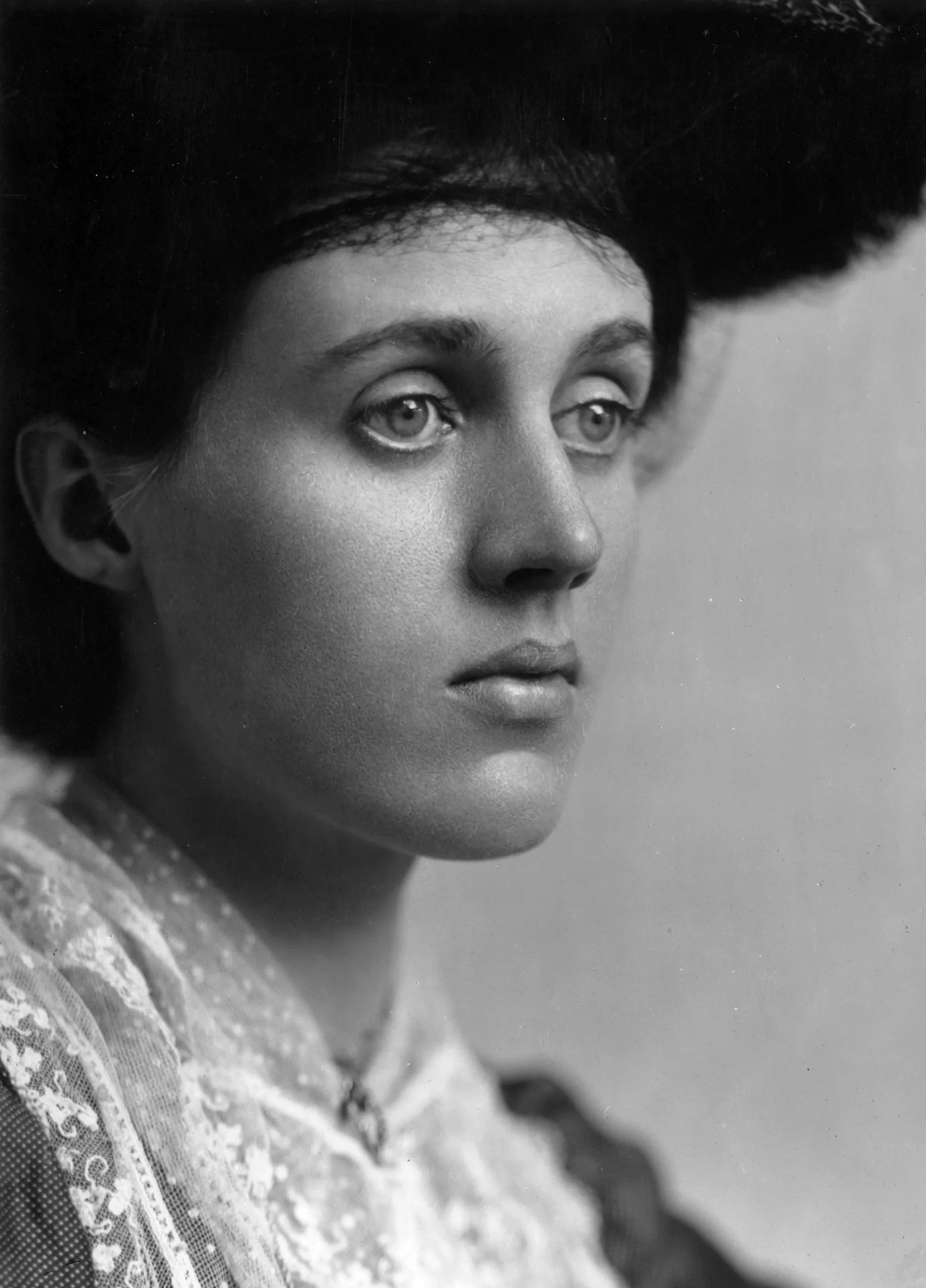
- Roger Fry, Portrait of Vanessa Bell, 1916
- Born: Vanessa Stephen; 30 May 1879; London, England
- Died: 7 April 1961 (aged 81); Charleston Farmhouse, Sussex, England
- Education: King's College London
- Occupations: Painter, interior designer
- Spouse: Clive Bell (m. 1907)
- Partner: Duncan Grant (1918–her death)
- Children: Julian Bell; Quentin Bell; Angelica Garnett
- Parents: Sir Leslie Stephen; Julia Duckworth Stephen
- Relatives: Virginia Woolf (sister); Thoby Stephen (brother); Adrian Stephen (brother); George Herbert Duckworth (half-brother); Gerald Duckworth (half-brother); Virginia Nicholson (granddaughter); Cressida Bell (granddaughter)

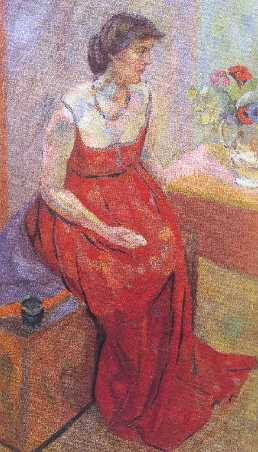
Roger Fry Portrait of Vanessa Bell, 1916

Vanessa Bell (née Stephen; 30 May 1879 – 7 April 1961) was an English painter and interior designer, a member of the Bloomsbury Group and the sister of Virginia Woolf.

== Biography ==
Vanessa Stephen was the elder daughter of the art critic and historian Sir Leslie Stephen (1832–1904) and the philanthropist Julia Prinsep Duckworth (1846–1895), although she was her father's second child and her mother's fourth child. The family included her sister Virginia, brothers Thoby (1880–1906) and Adrian (1883–1948), half-sister Laura (1870–1945) whose mother was Leslie's first wife, Harriett Thackeray, half-sister Stella Duckworth, and half-brothers George and Gerald Duckworth, who were Julia's children from her first marriage. Later in life, Virginia stated that, during their childhood, she and Vanessa had been sexually abused by George and Gerald.

The family lived at 22 Hyde Park Gate, London, and spent summers at Talland, the Cornwall house that would become the setting for Virginia's 1927 novel To the Lighthouse. In London, Vanessa was educated at home in languages, mathematics and history, and took drawing lessons from Ebenezer Cooke before attending Sir Arthur Cope's art school in 1896. In 1901, she studied painting at the Slade School of Fine Art.

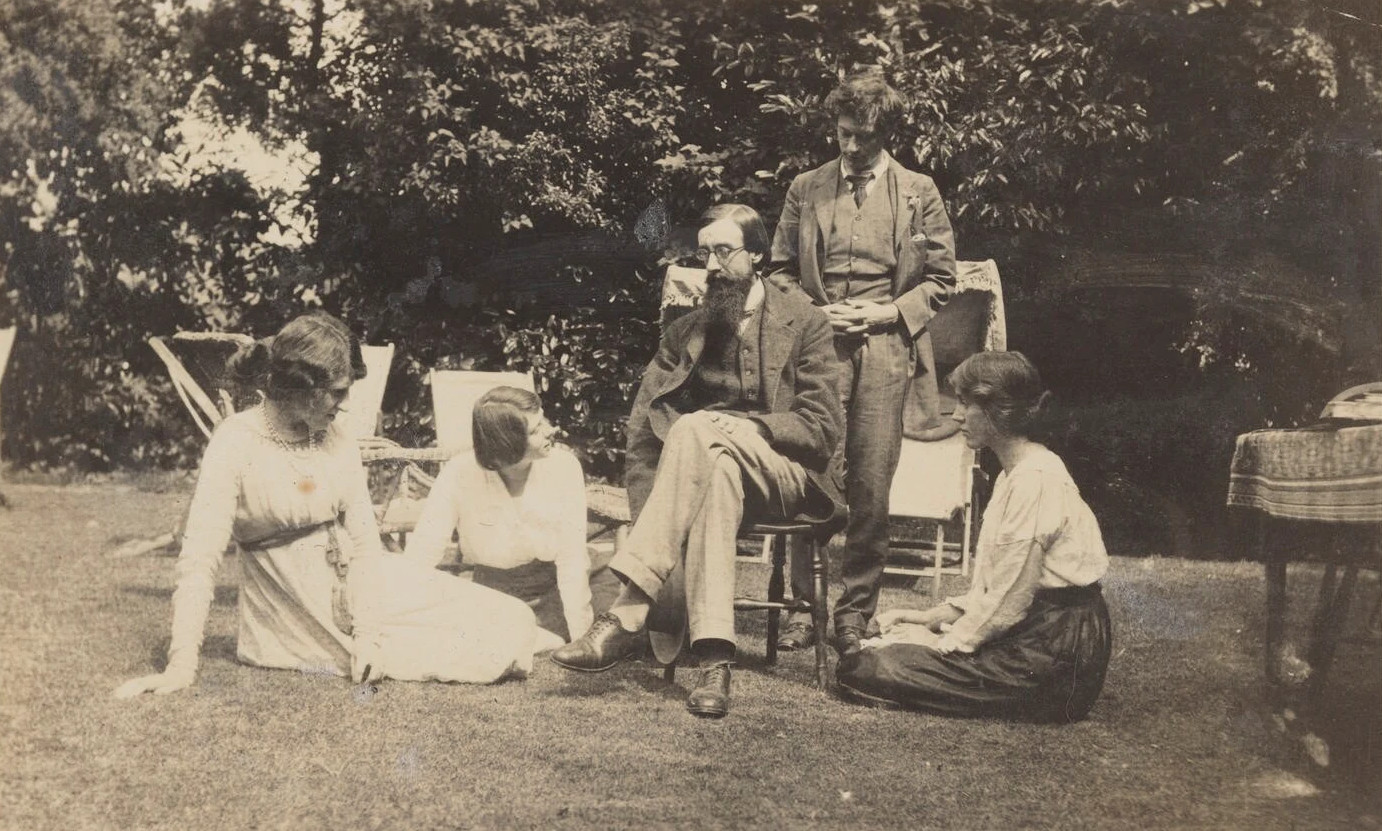
Lady Ottoline Morrell, Maria Nys (later Huxley), Lytton Strachey, Duncan Grant, Vanessa Bell (1915)

After the death of her father in 1904, Vanessa sold 22 Hyde Park Gate and moved to Gordon Square in Bloomsbury with her sister Virginia and brothers Thoby and Adrian. Thoby began inviting his Cambridge friends to 'at-homes' on Thursday evenings, where they discussed literary and artistic issues. These gatherings led to the formation of the Bloomsbury Group, which included Lytton Strachey, Clive Bell, John Maynard Keynes, E. M. Forster, Desmond MacCarthy, Leonard Woolf, Roger Fry, David Garnett, Arthur Waley and Duncan Grant.

Vanessa's daughter-in-law, Anne Olivier Bell, described her as "a woman of grave and distinguished beauty, with a low and beautiful speaking voice, characteristics which tended to mask her wit and humour and capacity for laughter."

In 1907, Vanessa married Clive Bell. They had two sons, Julian and Quentin. The couple had an open marriage, with both taking lovers throughout their lives. Clive had several affairs, including one with Mary Hutchinson and an intimate, though platonic, relationship with Virginia.

In 1911 Vanessa went on holiday to Turkey with her husband and Roger Fry. While there, she suffered a miscarriage, and a mental breakdown. Virginia went to Turkey to nurse her and while there, both women fell in love with Fry. Vanessa and Fry began a long relationship; the onset of this relationship is what made Virginia decide to marry Leonard Woolf. Upon returning to London, Vanessa, Clive, Duncan Grant, and David Garnett, who were lovers, left London and moved to Wissett Lodge in Harbury, Warwickshire, before settling at Charleston Farmhouse near Firle, East Sussex. Keynes was a frequent member of the household, until his marriage to Lydia Lopokova, whom Vanessa disliked. At Charleston, Vanessa began an intimate relationship with Grant, with whom she had a daughter, Angelica, in 1918. While Grant stayed with Vanessa for the rest of her life, Clive Bell raised Angelica as his own child; she was not told that Grant was her father until 1937.

In 1913, Vanessa, Fry and Grant established the Omega Workshops, a collective which produced avant-garde furniture, textiles, and household accessories. It was a cross-fertilization of fine and applied arts and included contributions from artists such as Henri Gaudier-Brzeska, Wyndham Lewis and Frederick Etchells. Although they received several commissions, they struggled through World War I and closed the business in 1919.

In 1936, despite the fact that all of his family members, and their friends, were ardent pacifists, Vanessa's son Julian determined that he would join the fight against fascism and take part in the Spanish Civil War—Forster told him that taking part would be immoral and Vanessa begged him not to go. Julian agreed to not go as a soldier, but as an ambulance driver with the British Medical Aid Unit. In July 1937, his ambulance was hit by a bomb and he died of his injuries, at age 29. Vanessa, who was then sharing a London studio with Grant, was so grief-stricken that it was several weeks before she could be moved to Charleston to recover; here, she was nursed by Virginia.

By March 1941, Virginia was overtaken by her mental illness and committed suicide. The sisters had always been extremely close and Virginia's death made Vanessa withdraw into her painting. She lived the rest of her life in relative isolation, surrounded by her children, seven grandchildren, husband and Duncan Grant.

On 7 April 1961, Vanessa died at Charleston of bronchitis, and was buried in the nearby churchyard of St Peter's Church, Firle. When Grant died in 1978, he was buried next to her.

== Art ==
First edition dustjacket of Virginia Woolf's novel Mrs Dalloway, 1925; cover art by Vanessa Bell

In 1906, when Bell began to think of herself as an artist, she formed the Friday Club to create a place in London that was more favourable to painting. Vanessa was encouraged by the Post-Impressionist exhibitions organised by Roger Fry, and she copied their bright colours and bold forms in her artworks. In 1914, she turned to Abstraction.

Bell rejected the examples of Victorian narrative painting and rejected a discourse on the ideal and aberrant qualities of femininity. She also designed book jackets for all of her sister Virginia's books that were published by Virginia and Leonard Woolf's publishing company, the Hogarth Press.

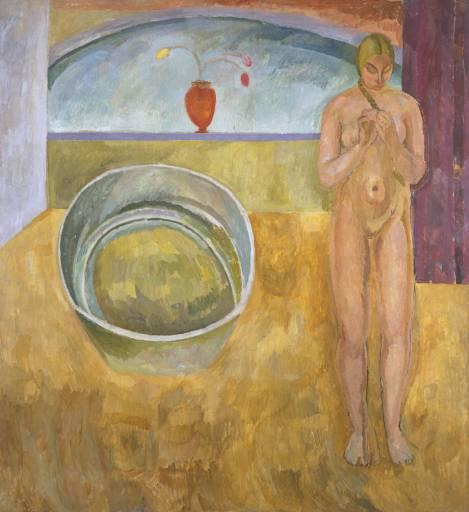
The Tub (1917), Tate Museum, London

Bell's paintings include Studland Beach (1912), The Tub (1918), Interior with Two Women (1932), and portraits of her sister Virginia Woolf (three in 1912), Aldous Huxley (1929–1930) and David Garnett (1916). Bell also worked with Duncan Grant to create murals for Berwick Church in Sussex (1940–42).

In 1932, Bell and Grant were commissioned to produce a dinner service for Kenneth Clark. With oversight from Kenneth's wife Jane Clark, they produced the Famous Women Dinner Service: 50 plates painted with portraits of notable women throughout history. The collection eventually entered the hands of a private collector, and passed out of public view until 2017. The full collection was exhibited in London in early 2018.

=== Exhibitions ===
In the summer of 1909, Iceland Poppies (1908) was exhibited at the New English Art Club. It was praised by Walter Sickert and marks Bell's artistic maturity.

Designs for a Screen: Figures by a Lake (1912), gouache on board, was influenced by Nabis paintings by Édouard Vuillard and Maurice Denis and might have been a part of Bell's exhibit Design for Screen, which was shown at the Friday Club Exhibition in February 1912.

Vanessa's first solo exhibition was at the Independent Gallery in London in 1922. That was followed by exhibitions at the Cooling Galleries, Lefevre Gallery, Leicester Galleries, and Adam Gallery.

Design for Overmantel (1913), oil on paper, depicts herself and Molly MacCarthy naked in Bell's studio at 46 Gordon Square.

Street Corner Conversation (also created in 1913) features four individuals in conversation amidst massive geometrical forms.

Summer Camp (1913), oil on board, illustrates a summer camp organized at Brandon on the Norfolk-Suffolk border near Thetford.

Barns (By the Estuary) (1915), oil on canvas, is a modestly scaled landscape showing her fondness for clarity of design in which segments of contrasting color harmonize.

Nude with Poppies (1916), oil on canvas, is a preliminary design for a headboard which Bell painted for Mary Hutchinson.

In 1920, she painted a mysterious narrative painting, The Party, which she exhibited in May 1922 at the prestigious London Group Exhibition but was not offered for sale. The painting was prominently illustrated and praised in the June 1922 issue of British Vogue, but then disappeared for 61 years until sold by the Anthony d'Offay Gallery from the estate of Virginia Woolf with the title of Mrs. Dalloway's Party. The source of its new title is unknown; Woolf's novel Mrs Dalloway was not published until 1925. Bell created the cover art for the first edition dust jacket of that novel.

In 1937, her work was exhibited at the Les femmes artistes d'Europe exhibition in Paris, which was the first French exhibition to be devoted solely to the work of women.

In 2021, Bell was one of four featured women artists at an exhibition at the Laing Art Gallery, Newcastle. Bell's work was included in the 2021 exhibition Women in Abstraction at the Centre Pompidou.

A 2024–25 exhibition at the MK Gallery in Milton Keynes, Vanessa Bell: A World of Form and Colour, has been claimed to be her largest-ever solo show. It included the Famous Women Dinner Service, a series of plates hand-painted by Bell and Duncan Grant depicting prominent women, and one man (Grant himself).

Several of Bell's works, including a self-portrait, a portrait of Virginia Woolf, several dust jackets and ten of The Famous Women Dinner Service were included in the Clark Art Institute's 2025 exhibition A Room of Her Own: Women Artists-Activists in Britain, 1875–1945.

== In media ==
Bell was portrayed by Janet McTeer in the Dora Carrington biopic Carrington (1995) and by Miranda Richardson in the film The Hours (2002). She was portrayed by Phoebe Fox and Eve Best in the BBC mini-series Life in Squares (2015). She was portrayed by Emerald Fennell in the 2018 film Vita & Virginia.

Bell is the subject of the Susan Sellers novel Vanessa and Virginia (2010), and of the Priya Parmar novel Vanessa and Her Sister (2014).

== See also ==
- List of Bloomsbury Group people

== Bibliography ==
- Spalding, Frances (2016) [1983]. Vanessa Bell: Portrait of the Bloomsbury Artist. I.B.Tauris. ISBN 978-1-78453-241-3.
- Tickner, Lisa (Winter 1999). "Vanessa Bell: Studland Beach, Domesticity, and "Significant Form"". Representations. 65 (Special Issue: New Perspectives in British Studies): 63–92. doi:10.1525/rep.1999.65.1.01p0033o. JSTOR 2902962.
- Sketches in Pen and Ink, Vanessa Bell
- A Passionate Apprentice: the early journals, Virginia Woolf
- A Moment's Liberty, Virginia Woolf
- A Very Close Conspiracy: Vanessa Bell and Virginia Woolf, Jane Dunn
- Duncan Grant, Frances Spalding
- Deceived with Kindness: a Bloomsbury Childhood, Angelica Garnett
- Elders and Betters, Quentin Bell
- Vanessa and Virginia, Susan Sellers (fictional biography)
- Charleston, Quentin Bell and Virginia Nicholson
- Virginia Woolf, Hermione Lee
- Vanessa and Her Sister, Priya Parmar (novel)
