= Francis Birrell =

English writer (1889–1935)

Francis Frederick Locker Birrell (17 February 1889 – 2 January 1935) was an English writer and bookseller.

Birrell was the son of Augustine Birrell and Eleanor Tennyson (born Locker-Lampson). It was the second marriage for each of his parents. He was educated at Eton College and King's College, Cambridge. During and after his time at Cambridge, he became associated with the Bloomsbury Group, and was a friend of Lytton Strachey and the novelist David Garnett. Later in life, he grew closer to Raymond Mortimer, who cared for him after a brain tumour left him disabled in the year before his death.

== See also ==
- List of Bloomsbury Group people
