= Cressida Bell =

English artist and designer

- Born: 1959 (age 66–67)
- Relatives: Quentin Bell father; Anne Olivier Bell mother; Vanessa Bell grandmother; Virginia Woolf great aunt
- Website: https://www.cressidabell.co.uk/

Cressida Bell (born 1959) is an English artist and designer, specializing in textiles, interior design, cake decoration and illustration.

She is the daughter of critic, author and artist Quentin Bell and Anne Olivier Bell. She is the granddaughter of Vanessa Bell and great niece of Virginia Woolf.

She studied at Middlesex Polytechnic, Saint Martin's School of Art and finally at the Royal College of Art in London, where she graduated in 1984 with an MA in textile design.

Bell is a designer of textiles, lampshades, greetings cards and stationery, known for colourful patterns which hark back to early 20th century British design.

Bell also decorates cakes to commission, having published a book Cressida Bell’s Cake Design in 2013.

== Publications ==
- Cressida Bell - The Decorative Painter (1996)
- Cressida Bell - Cressida Bell’s Cake Design: Fifty Fabulous Cakes (2013)

== See also ==
- List of Bloomsbury Group people
