= Aspects of Love (novel) =

1955 novel by David Garnett

- First edition
- Author: David Garnett
- Language: English
- Genre: Romantic novel
- Publisher: Chatto & Windus
- Publication date: 1955
- Publication place: United Kingdom
- Media type: Print (Hardback & Paperback)

Aspects of Love is a novel by author David Garnett centering on the loves of a young soldier named Alexis Golightly, his uncle George Dillingham, and the beautiful actress Rose Vibert from whom neither man could escape. It was originally published in 1955.

In 1989, this book served as the basis for Andrew Lloyd Webber's musical of the same name.

== Synopsis ==
Alexis, a young Englishman recently expelled from school, enlists in the army. He falls in love with a beautiful French actress named Rose Vibert, who later abandons him to marry his uncle, an older, more learned man named Sir George Dillingham. Years later, Alexis returns to George and Rose's lives and meets their 13-year-old daughter, Jenny. As Jenny spends more time with Alexis, she falls madly in love with him. After George dies from a heart attack, Alexis meets and falls in love with Giulietta, who was George's lover before Rose.
