= Eva Vermandel =

Eva Vermandel (born 1974) is a photographer born in Belgium who relocated to London in 1996 to live and work. Known for her still and timeless portraits which often bear references to painting (the Flemish Primitives, Ingres, Bronzino), her photographs have appeared in a wide range of magazines such as The Wire, Telegraph Magazine, Independent Magazine, Mojo, The New York Times Magazine, and W.

Vermandel has had solo exhibitions at the Douglas Hyde Gallery in Dublin and the Whitechapel Gallery and the ICA in London. Her work is in the collections of the V&A, the National Galleries of Scotland and the National Portrait Gallery,

== Publications ==
- Alabama Chrome: a photo essay on the economic boom in Ireland at its peak in 2006, commissioned and published by the Douglas Hyde Gallery, Dublin.
- Med sud í eyrum vid spilum endalaust: a photo diary on the Icelandic band Sigur Rós, following them through the process of recording and touring between April and June 2008.
- Splinter: a monograph on a body of work created between 2006 and 2012, published by Hatje Cantz in 2013.
