= David Garnett =

British writer and publisher (1892–1981)

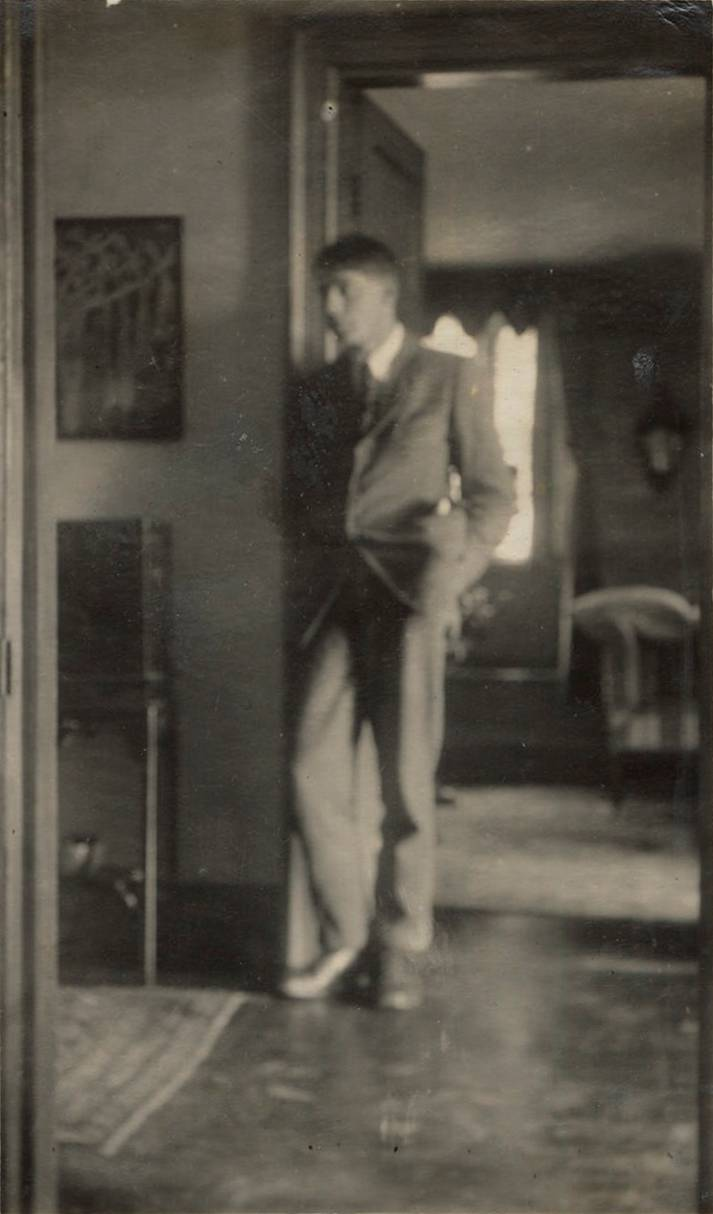
- Garnett in 1920, by Lady Ottoline Morrell
- Born: 9 March 1892; Brighton, East Sussex, England
- Died: 17 February 1981 (aged 88); Montcuq, Lot, France
- Spouses: Rachel Marshall (m. 1921; died 1940) Angelica Bell (m. 1942; div. 1967)
- Children: 6, including Amaryllis Garnett and Henrietta Garnett
- Parents: Edward Garnett (father); Constance Black (mother)

David Garnett (9 March 1892 – 17 February 1981) was an English writer and publisher. As a child, he had a cloak made of rabbit skin and thus received the nickname "Bunny", by which he was known to friends and intimates all his life.

== Early life ==
Garnett was born in Brighton, East Sussex, the only child of writer, critic and publisher Edward Garnett and his wife Constance Clara Black, a translator of Russian. His paternal grandfather and great-grandfather both worked at what is now the British Library, then within the British Museum.

Encouraged by his father, he gained his first paid work at the age of eleven, drawing a map entitled "NEW SEA and the BEVIS COUNTRY", signed "D. G. fecit", to illustrate a new edition of Bevis, a boy's adventure story by Richard Jefferies. For this he received five shillings from the publisher Gerald Duckworth, for whom his father was a reader. He was then sent as a day boy to a prep school called Westerham, five miles from the Cearne, being expected to travel there daily on a scaled-down version of a penny-farthing bicycle which had been owned by his uncle Arthur Garnett as a boy, wearing a beret. As a result of this, the other boys gave him the name "Onions".

In 1905, Garnett's mother moved into a rented flat in Hampstead, from where he began to attend University College School in Gower Street, London, travelling there daily by horse-drawn tram. In his time between school and university, Garnett befriended Vinayak Damodar Savarkar, then in Brixton Prison, and devised an unsuccessful attempt to spring him from the jail. He spent July and August 1910 in Germany, to learn the language, and then in October was admitted to the Royal College of Science in South Kensington, a department of Imperial College, London, to study zoology and botany, where he was taught by J. B. Farmer, Adam Sedgwick, and Clifford Dobell.

As a conscientious objector in the First World War, Garnett worked on fruit farms in Suffolk and Sussex with his lover Duncan Grant.

== Work ==
Needing money, in 1919 Garnett wrote a sensational novel called Dope Darling: A Story of Cocaine, set during the First World War, which tells the story of an affair between a young medical student and a night-club singer and drug addict called Claire Plowman. According to a biographer of Garnett, Claire bore a striking resemblance to Betty May, with a nod to Lilian Shelley. For this, he used the pen name of Leda Burke.

A prominent member of the Bloomsbury Group, Garnett received literary recognition when his novel Lady into Fox, an allegorical fantasy, was awarded the 1922 James Tait Black Memorial Prize for fiction. He ran a bookshop near the British Museum with Francis Birrell during the 1920s. He also founded (with Francis Meynell) the Nonesuch Press. He wrote the novel Aspects of Love (1955), on which the later Andrew Lloyd Webber musical of the same name would be based.

Garnett published a memoir, The Golden Echo in 1953. Subsequently, he wrote two further volumes under the title The Golden Echo with subtitles The Flowers of the Forest (1955), and The Familiar Faces (1962). In this memoir, Garnett described the English literary circles he moved among, including the Bloomsbury group.

== Personal life ==
He first married, in 1921, the illustrator Rachel Alice "Ray" Marshall (1891–1940), sister of the translator and diarist Frances Partridge. He and Ray, whose woodcuts appear in some of Garnett's books, had two sons, the older of whom was Richard Garnett (1923–2013), the writer. Rachel Garnett died of breast cancer in 1940.

Garnett was bisexual, as were several members of the artistic and literary Bloomsbury Group, and he had affairs with Francis Birrell and Duncan Grant. On 25 December 1918 he was present at the birth of Grant's daughter by Vanessa Bell, Angelica, who was accepted by Vanessa's husband Clive Bell. Shortly afterwards he wrote to a friend: "I think of marrying it. When she is 20, I shall be 46 – will it be scandalous?" On 8 May 1942, when Angelica was in her early twenties, they did marry, to the horror of her parents. She did not find out until much later that her husband had been a lover of her father. The Garnetts lived at Hilton Hall, near St Ives in Huntingdonshire, where David Garnett had a farm with a herd of Jersey cows, an orchard, a swimming pool, sculptures, and a dovehouse.

They had four daughters: in order, Amaryllis, Henrietta, and the twins Nerissa and Frances; eventually the couple separated. Amaryllis was an actress who had a small part in Harold Pinter's film adaptation of The Go-Between (1971). She drowned in the Thames, aged 29. Henrietta (1945–2019) married Lytton Burgo Partridge, the nephew of her father's first wife Ray, but was left a widow with a newborn infant when she was 18; she oversaw the legacies of both David Garnett and Duncan Grant. Nerissa Garnett (1946–2004) was an artist, ceramicist, and photographer. Fanny (Frances) Garnett moved to France where she became a farmer.

== Later life ==
After his separation from Angelica, Garnett moved to France and lived in the grounds at the Château de Charry, Montcuq (near Cahors), in a house leased to him by the owners, Jo and Angela d'Urville. Garnett continued to write and lived there until his death in 1981.

== List of selected publications ==
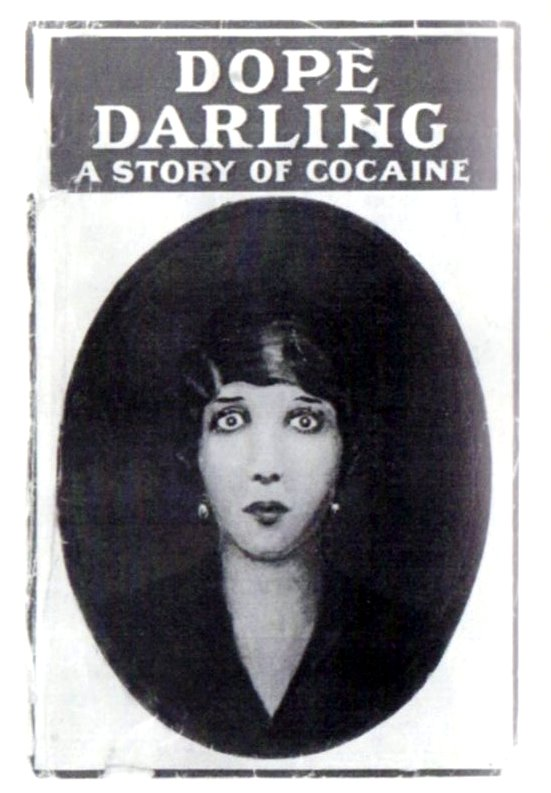
The cover of Dope-Darling: A Story of Cocaine.

- Dope Darling (1919), novel, as Leda Burke
- Lady into Fox (1922), novel
- A Man in the Zoo (1924), novel
- The Sailor's Return (1925), novel
- Go She Must! (1927), novel
- The Old Dove Cote (1928), short stories
- A Voyage to the Island of the Articoles by André Maurois (1928), translator
- Never Be a Bookseller (1929), memoirs
- No Love (1929), novel
- The Grasshoppers Come (1931)
- A Terrible Day (1932)
- A Rabbit in the Air. Notes from a diary kept while learning to handle an aeroplane (1932)
- Pocahontas (1933)
- Letters from John Galsworthy 1900–1932 (1934)
- Beany-Eye (1935)
- The Letters of T. E. Lawrence (1938), editor
- The Battle of Britain (1941)
- War in the Air (1941)
- The Campaign in Greece and Crete (1942)
- The Novels of Thomas Love Peacock (1948), editor
- Selected Letters of T. E. Lawrence (1952), editor
- Aspects of Love (1955)
- A Shot in the Dark (1958)
- A Net for Venus (1959) novel
- Two by Two (1963), novel
- 338171 T. E. (Lawrence of Arabia) by Victoria Ocampo (1963), translator
- Ulterior Motives (1966) novel
- The White/Garnett Letters (1968), correspondence with T. H. White
- Carrington: Letters & Extracts From Her Diaries (1970)
- First "Hippy" Revolution (1970)
- A Clean Slate (1971)
- The Sons of the Falcon (1972), novel
- Purl and Plain (1973) stories
- Plough Over the Bones (1973), novel
- The Master Cat (1974)
- Up She Rises (1977)
- — (1980). Great Friends: Portraits of Seventeen Writers. Atheneum. ISBN 978-0-689-11039-9. (Full text available on Internet Archive)
- David Garnett. C.B.E. A Writer's Library (1983)
- Sylvia & David. The Townsend Warner / Garnett Letters (1994), correspondence with Sylvia Townsend Warner
- The Secret History of PWE : The Political Warfare Executive, 1939–1945 (2002)

Autobiography

- Garnett, David (1953). The Golden Echo. Chatto & Windus. (Full text available on Internet Archive)
- — (1955). The Flowers of the Forest. Chatto & Windus. (Full text available on Internet Archive)
- — (1962). The familiar faces. Chatto & Windus. (Full text available on Internet Archive)

== Bibliography ==
- Knights, Sarah (2015). Bloomsbury's Outsider: A Life of David Garnett. Bloomsbury Publishing. ISBN 978-1-4482-1544-7.
  - Taylor, D. J. (23 July 2015). "Bloomsbury's Outsider: A Life of David Garnett by Sarah Knights". The Guardian (Review).
  - Wade, Francesca (26 June 2015). "Dangerous liaisons among the Bloomsbury set". The Daily Telegraph (Review).
- Heilbrun, Carolyn G., The Garnett Family (1961), also on Richard Garnett, Jeremiah Garnett, Edward Garnett, Constance Garnett.
- David Garnett: English writer. Encyclopædia Britannica. 13 February 2021.
