= Angelica Garnett =

British writer and artist (1918–2012)

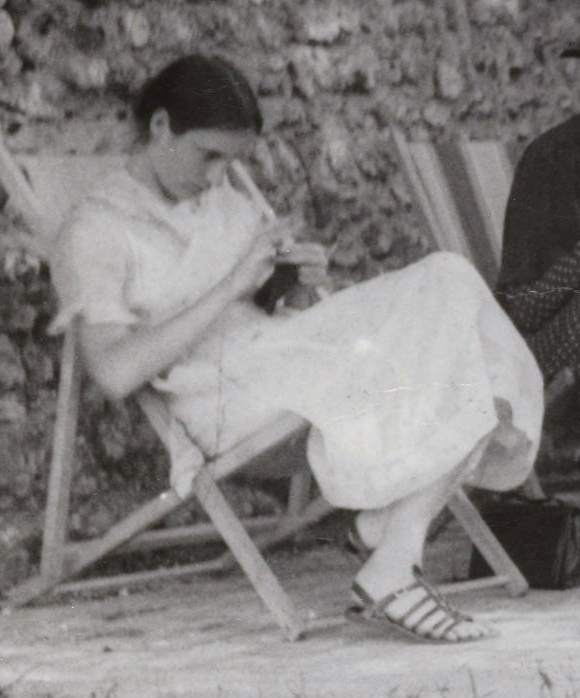
- Photo of Angelica Garnett sitting outside. Picture from Virginia Woolf Monk's House photograph album.
- Born: Angelica Vanessa Bell; 25 December 1918; Charleston Farmhouse, Sussex, England
- Died: 4 May 2012 (aged 93); Aix-en-Provence, Bouches-du-Rhône, France
- Spouse: David Garnett (m. 1942; div. 1967)
- Children: 4 daughters, including Amaryllis and Henrietta Garnett
- Parent(s): Vanessa Bell (mother); Clive Bell (adoptive father); Duncan Grant (biological father)

Angelica Vanessa Garnett (née Bell; 25 December 1918 – 4 May 2012), was a British writer, painter and artist. She was the author of the memoir Deceived with Kindness (1984), an account of her experience growing up at the heart of the Bloomsbury Group.

== Family background ==
Angelica Garnett was born at Charleston Farmhouse in East Sussex on Christmas Day 1918. She was the biological daughter of the painter Duncan Grant and Vanessa Bell; her aunt was Virginia Woolf.

Until the summer of 1937, when Garnett was 18, she believed her biological father was Clive Bell, Vanessa's husband, rather than the mostly homosexual Grant, although the reality was an open secret within their immediate Bloomsbury circle. In fact, although there was no formal separation or divorce, the Bells' marriage had come to an end in 1916. In that year, Vanessa rented Charleston Farmhouse from the Gage estate, so that Duncan Grant, with whom she had fallen in love, and his lover, David Garnett, could work there as farm labourers; both were conscientious objectors. Grant and Vanessa Bell continued to live together after the presumed end of their sexual relationship. Clive Bell would visit at weekends.

When Vanessa Bell informed her daughter of her true parentage she advised her not to talk about it. The deception avoided servant gossip and preserved the possibility of a legacy from Clive Bell's father who had settled allowances on his grandchildren. Angelica grew up believing that two of those grandchildren, Vanessa and Clive's sons, Julian Bell, who was killed in 1937 during the Spanish Civil War, and the art historian Quentin Bell, were her biological brothers, rather than her biological half-brothers. Vanessa comforted herself with the idea that her daughter had two fathers; "in reality," Angelica wrote, "I had none".

== Education ==
Angelica Garnett grew up at Charleston, indulged by her mother and surrounded by the artists, writers and intellectuals of the Bloomsbury Group. After her 14th birthday, Virginia Woolf gave Angelica a clothing budget of £100 a year.

At the age of ten she was sent to boarding school at Langford Grove in Essex. She left without any qualifications, spent several months living in Rome and in 1935 moved for a time to Paris, staying with the artist Zoum Walter and her writer husband Francois. In 1936 Angelica went to the London Theatre Studio to train, briefly, as an actress under Michel Saint-Denis and George Devine. She changed to the study of art at the Euston Road School, where she was taught by William Coldstream and Victor Pasmore, the latter of whom apparently reduced her to tears.

== Marriage ==
In 1942, aged 24, Angelica married David Garnett, by then an editor, reviewer and novelist whose parents were Edward Garnett and Constance Garnett, the noted translator of Russian literature. The relationship had begun in the spring of 1938, when Garnett was married to his first wife, Rachel "Ray" Marshall, who was dying of cancer. Angelica had four daughters with Garnett—Amaryllis, Henrietta, Nerissa, and Frances.

Garnett was a member of her parents' circle and a former lover of Duncan Grant, her father. When Angelica was born, Garnett had written to Lytton Strachey saying of the baby: "Its beauty is the remarkable thing … I think of marrying it; when she is 20 I shall be 46 – will it be scandalous?" In fact Garnett was nearly 50 at the time of their marriage. Despite their consternation, Angelica's parents did not inform their daughter of these details of Garnett's past, although various associates of the family did attempt to warn her against the marriage: John Maynard Keynes had her to tea. Angelica lost her virginity to Garnett in H. G. Wells's spare bedroom.

The couple moved to Hilton Hall, Cambridgeshire, which David Garnett had bought in 1924. His novella, Aspects of Love (1955), dedicated to Angelica and involving similarly complicated domestic arrangements, was later adapted into a highly successful musical by Andrew Lloyd Webber. The Garnetts separated in 1967.

For a time Angelica was in love with George Bergen, a Russian-Jewish painter who had been another of Duncan Grant's lovers, but the relationship did not last.

== Memoir ==
In 1984 Angelica Garnett published her memoir, Deceived with Kindness: A Bloomsbury Childhood. The book was direct and sharply critical in its description of her upbringing and relationship with her parents, revealing Bloomsbury's rather conventional inability to confront deep personal feelings. In those characteristics it was a departure from much of the coverage the Bloomsbury Group had received up to that time. In it Garnett wrote, "My dream of the perfect father – unrealized – possessed me, and has done so for the rest of my life. My marriage was but a continuation of it, and almost engulfed me." The memoir was awarded the J. R. Ackerley Prize for Autobiography in 1985.

Garnett was the author of a second memoir, The Eternal Moment (1998), and published a volume of autobiographical fiction entitled The Unspoken Truth: A Quartet of Bloomsbury Stories (2010). At the time of her death she had been working on an autobiography.

== Later life and work ==
After the end of her marriage, Angelica Garnett moved to Islington, north London. She moved back to Charleston after the death of Duncan Grant in 1978, before moving to nearby Ringmer and then to France. Garnett had spent long parts of her childhood staying in the south of France, mostly at Cassis, near Marseille.

Garnett was actively involved in the efforts that saw Charleston restored and opened to the public as a museum. She advised on the reconstruction of its fabrics, and on the selection and application of pigments; also talking at festivals and giving fund-raising lectures, including in America. In 1994 she donated more than 8000 sketches and drawings by Duncan Grant and Vanessa Bell to The Charleston Trust.

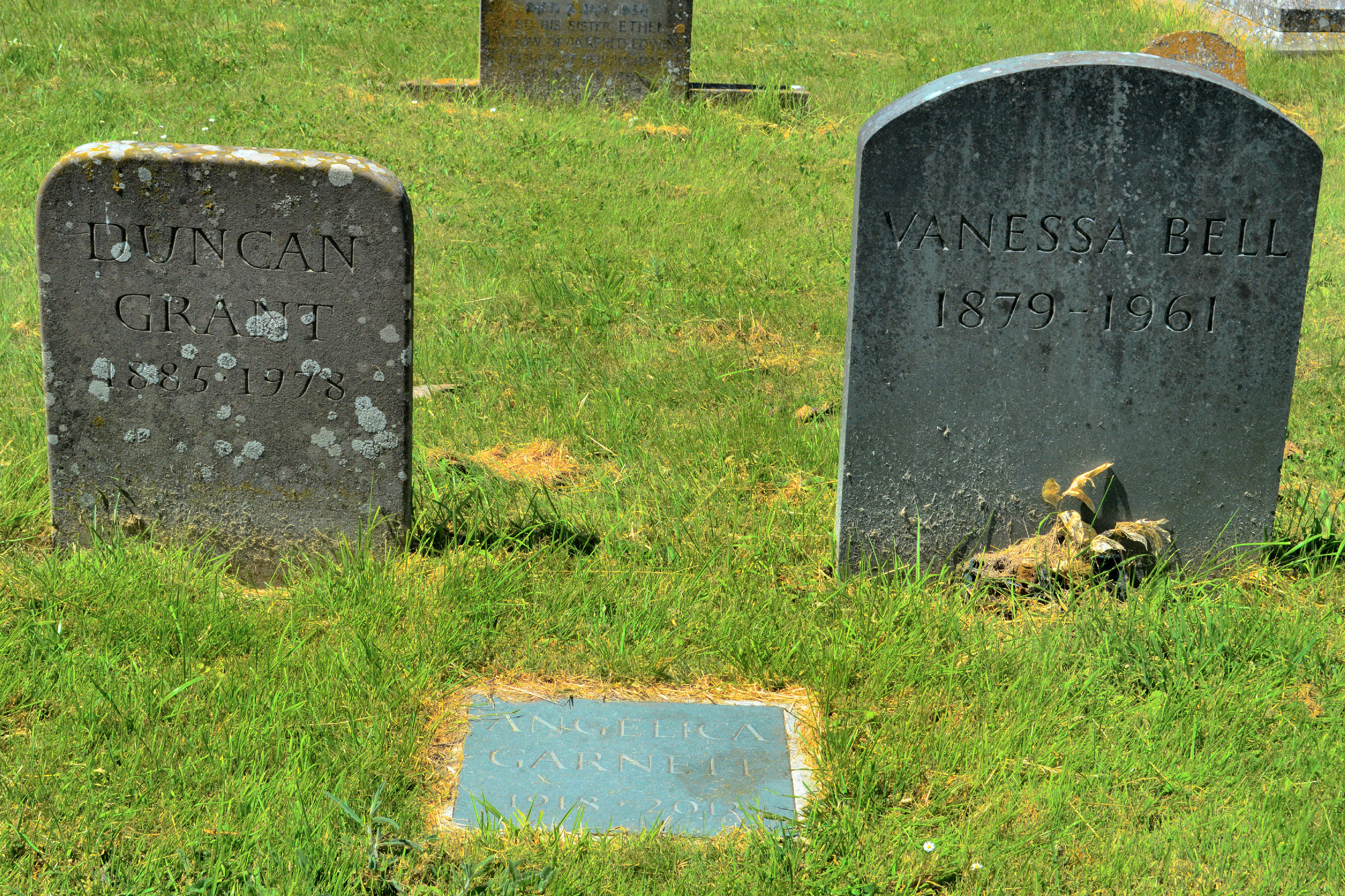
Firle, St Peters Church. Memorial to Angelica Garnett.

Angelica Garnett continued to paint, developing a reputation, mostly for still lifes, and exhibiting in Europe and America. She also worked with mosaics, designed book jackets and textiles, decorated pots, and, in the 1980s, began to create sculptures using found objects and materials.

The last 30 years of her life were spent in Forcalquier in the south of France. Angelica Garnett died in Aix-en-Provence on 4 May 2012.

== Children ==
With David Garnett, Angelica had four daughters: Amaryllis Virginia (1943–1973), an actress; Henrietta (1945–2019), a writer; Nerissa, called Nel (1946–2004), a painter, photographer and ceramics artist; and Nel's twin Frances, called Fanny (b. 1946), who farms in France.

When Henrietta Garnett was 17 she married Lytton Burgo Partridge, the son of Frances Partridge, who was the sister of David Garnett's first wife. Burgo Partridge died from a heart attack less than a year later, three weeks after the birth of their daughter, Sophie Vanessa. Amaryllis Garnett drowned in the Thames in 1973; she was 29. Nerissa Garnett died from a brain tumour in 2004.
