= Virginia Nicholson =

English author on Bloomsbury Group

Virginia Nicholson FRSL
- Born: Virginia Bell; 1955 (age 70–71); Newcastle, England
- Occupation: Non-fiction author
- Spouse: William Nicholson (m. 1988)
- Parent(s): Quentin Bell and Anne Olivier Bell
- Relatives: Virginia Woolf (great-aunt)
- Website: virginianicholson.co.uk

Virginia Nicholson (née Bell; born 1955) is an English non-fiction author known for her works of women's history in the first half of the twentieth century. Nicholson was born in Newcastle and grew up in Leeds, before becoming a television researcher. She was elected a Fellow of the Royal Society of Literature in 2019.

== Family ==
Her father was the writer and art historian Quentin Bell, nephew of Virginia Woolf; her mother, Anne Olivier Bell, edited Virginia Woolf's diaries. She married writer William Nicholson in 1988.

== Selected publications ==
- Charleston: A Bloomsbury House and Gardens. London: Frances Lincoln, 1997. (With Quentin Bell). ISBN 0711211337
- Among the Bohemians: Experiments in Living 1900-1939. London: Viking, 2002. ISBN 0670889660
- Singled Out - How Two Million Women Survived Without Men After the First World War. Viking, 2007. ISBN 978-0670915644
- Millions Like Us: Women's Lives During the Second World War. Viking, 2011. ISBN 978-0670917785
- Perfect Wives in Ideal Homes: The Story of Women in the 1950s. Viking, 2015. ISBN 978-0670921317
