= Edward Garnett =

British writer and critic (1868–1937)

Edward William Garnett (5 January 1868 – 19 February 1937) was an English writer, critic and literary editor, who was instrumental in the publication of D. H. Lawrence's Sons and Lovers.

== Early life and family ==
Edward Garnett was born in London. His father, Richard Garnett (1835–1906), was a writer and librarian at the British Museum. On 31 August 1889 Edward married Constance Black, subsequently known for her translations of Russian literature; the writer David Garnett (1892–1981) was their son.

== Career ==
Garnett had only a few years' formal education at the City of London School, leaving at the age of 16, but he educated himself further by reading widely. He gained a high reputation at the time for a mixture of good sense and sensitivity in relation to contemporary literature. His influence through his encouragement of leading authors exceeded by far that of his own writing. His literary contacts and correspondents spread far and wide, from Peter Kropotkin to Edward Thomas.

He worked as an editor and reader for the London publishing houses of T. Fisher Unwin, Gerald Duckworth and Company, and then Jonathan Cape. He brought together in 1898 Joseph Conrad, an Unwin author to whom he acted as a mentor as well as a friend, and Ford Madox Ford; they collaborated in the first few years of the twentieth century. Garnett befriended D. H. Lawrence, and for a time influenced him in the direction of realist fiction. In preparing Sons and Lovers for publication by Duckworth, Garnett went through the manuscript, censoring some passages and cutting others until the novel was ten per cent shorter; he did not negotiate these changes with Lawrence, but sent the manuscript direct to the printers. The changes including replacing 'hips' with 'body' and 'thighs' with 'limbs.' He removed the word 'natural' from 'He could smell her faint natural perfume.' Lawrence accepted the changes, saying "It's got to sell, I've got to live."

Garnett also had a role in getting T. E. Lawrence's work published. One of his oversights was to turn down for Duckworth James Joyce's A Portrait of the Artist as a Young Man, in 1915. He was a strong supporter of John Galsworthy, and The Man of Property in The Forsyte Saga was dedicated to him. He also championed American writers Stephen Crane and Robert Frost and Australia's Henry Lawson, and helped the Irish writer Liam O'Flaherty.

His play The Breaking Point was not allowed a licence for dramatic performance in London under the censorship system of the time (Lord Chamberlain's Office). Its publication was permitted, and in 1907 Garnett published the play, which dealt with an unmarried mother, together with an open letter to the censor. The letter was in fact written by the critic William Archer. This was one battle in a campaign being waged at the time, under the leadership of Bernard Shaw, to free the stage.

Garnett lived at The Cearne, Crockham Hill, near Edenbridge in Kent. His London address was 19, Pond Place, Chelsea.

== Works ==
- An Imaged World (1894)
- The Art of Winnifred Matthews (1902)
- The Breaking Point, a Censured Play. With Preface and a Letter to the Censor (1907)
- Hogarth (1911)
- Tolstoy: His Life and Writings (1914)
- The great war in 1916, a neutral's indictment (1917) with Louis Raemaekers, H. Perry Robinson, and M. B. Huish
- Turgenev: a study (1917)
- Papa's War and Other Satires (1918)
- Friday Nights: Literary Criticisms and Appreciations (1922; new ed. 1929)
- Letters from W. H. Hudson, 1901–1922 (1923), editor
- Letters from Joseph Conrad 1895–1924 (1928), editor
- The trial of Jeanne d' Arc and other plays (1931), editor
- Letters from John Galsworthy 1900–1932 (1934), editor
- Edward Thomas: A selection of letters to Edward Garnett (1981 reprint)
