= Duncan Grant =

Scottish painter and designer

- Self-Portrait, 1920, National Gallery of Scotland
- Born: Duncan James Corrowr Grant; 21 January 1885; Rothiemurchus, Aviemore, Inverness-shire, Scotland
- Died: 8 May 1978 (aged 93); Aldermaston, Berkshire, England
- Occupations: Artist, designer
- Known for: Member of the Bloomsbury Group
- Partner(s): Vanessa Bell; Paul Roche

Duncan James Corrowr Grant (21 January 1885 – 8 May 1978) was a Scottish painter and designer of textiles, pottery, theatre sets, and costumes. He was a member of the Bloomsbury Group. His father was Bartle Grant, a "poverty-stricken" major in the army, and much of his early childhood was spent in India and Burma. He was a grandson of Sir John Peter Grant GCMG KCB, 12th Laird of Rothiemurchus and sometime Lieutenant-Governor of Bengal.

== Early life ==
=== Childhood ===
Grant was born on 21 January 1885, to Major Bartle Grant and Ethel Isabel McNeil in Rothiemurchus, Aviemore, Scotland. Between 1887 and 1894, the family lived in India and Burma, returning to Scotland every two years. During this period, Grant was educated by his governess, Alice Bates. Along with Rupert Brooke, Grant attended Hillbrow School, Rugby, 1894–99, where he received lessons from an art teacher and became interested in Japanese prints. During this period, Grant spent his school holidays at Hogarth's House, Chiswick, with his grandmother, Lady Grant. He attended St Paul's School, London (as a boarder for two terms), 1899–1901, where he was awarded several art prizes.

=== Art education and European influence ===
Self-Portrait with Seated Male Nude in 1908

A sketch of David Garnett in 1915-17

From about 1899/1900 to 1906, Grant lived with his aunt and uncle, Sir Richard and Lady Strachey and their children. When Grant was younger, he accompanied Lady Strachey to "picture Sunday" which gave him the opportunity to meet with eminent painters. Lady Strachey was able to persuade Grant's parents that he should be allowed to pursue an education in art. In 1902, Grant was enrolled by his aunt at Westminster School of Art; he attended for the next three years. While at Westminster, Grant was encouraged in his studies by Simon Bussy, a French painter and lifelong friend of Matisse, who went on to marry Dorothy Strachey.

In the winter of 1904–5, Grant visited Italy where, commissioned by Harry Strachey, he made copies of part of the Masaccio frescoes in the Brancacci Chapel, in the Church of Santa Maria del Carmine, Florence. Grant also made a study of the Portrait of Federigo da Montefeltro, one half of the Diptych of Federico da Montefeltro and Battista Sforza by Piero della Francesca in the Uffizi and was greatly impressed by the frescoes of Piero in the Basilica of San Francesco, Arezzo. On his return, at the advice of Simon Bussy, Grant made a copy of the Angel musicians in Piero's Nativity in the National Gallery, London.

Grant was introduced to Vanessa Bell (then Vanessa Stephen) by Pippa Strachey at the Friday Club in the autumn of 1905. From 1906, thanks to a gift of £100 from an aunt, Grant spent a year in Paris studying at the Académie de La Palette, Jacques-Émile Blanche's school. During this period, he visited the Musée du Luxembourg and saw, among other paintings, the Caillebotte bequest of French Impressionists.

In January 1907, and again in the summer of 1908, Grant spent a term at the Slade School of Art. In 1908, Grant painted a portrait of John Maynard Keynes, whom he had met the previous year, while the two were on holiday in Orkney. A year later, the pair would share rooms on Belgrave Road.

In 1909, Grant visited Leo and Gertrude Stein in Paris and saw their collection that included paintings by, among others, Picasso and Matisse. In the summer, with an introduction from Simon Bussy, Grant visited Matisse himself, then living at Clamart, Paris.

== Duncan Grant in London ==
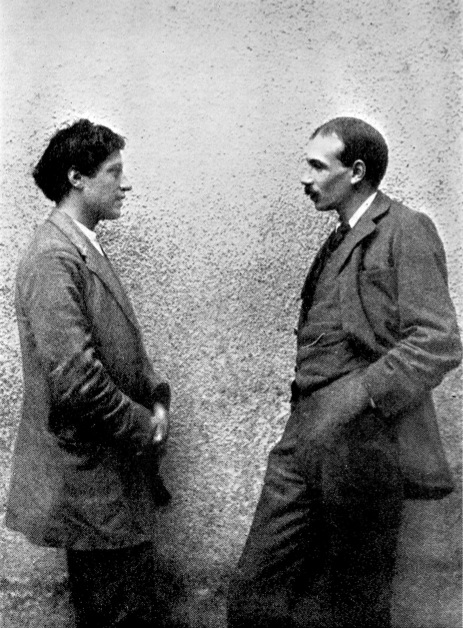
Duncan Grant and John Maynard Keynes c. 1913.

=== Bloomsbury Foundations ===
In November 1909, Grant moved to 21 Fitzroy Square, where he occupied two rooms on the second floor of the building on the west side of the square. A few doors away, at 29 Fitzroy Square, lived Adrian and Virginia Stephen (later Virginia Woolf). Grant would later recall: 'a close friendship sprang up between Adrian Stephen and myself and I had only to tap on the window to be let in. The maid told Virginia "that Mr Grant gets in everywhere". But very irregular as my visits were, they became more and more a habit, and I think they soon became frequent enough to escape notice.'

In June 1910 Grant exhibited with the Friday Club at the Alpine Club Gallery. Later that year Grant would visit Roger Fry's Manet and the Post-Impressionists exhibition at the Grafton Galleries in Mayfair, which included work by the likes of Gauguin, Matisse and Van Gogh, where he was said to be particularly interested in the paintings of Paul Cézanne.

During the summer of 1911, Grant was invited by Roger Fry to contribute to the redecoration of the dining room at the Borough Polytechnic (now London South Bank University). Grant composed two oil paintings to fit with the theme of illustrating London on Holiday. Both his paintings, Football and Bathing, bear the influence of early Italian art and Byzantine mosaics. Grant also drew on his exposure to the work of the post-impressionists; The Times reported of his depiction of the figures that 'Mr Grant has used all his remarkable powers of draughtsmanship to represent the act of swimming rather than any individual swimmers.'

=== The Dreadnought Hoax ===
In February 1910, Grant, along with Horace de Vere Cole, Virginia Stephen, Adrian Stephen and others, disguised themselves as an Abyssinian royal delegation and fooled their way on to HMS Dreadnought. The delegation was greeted by a band and given a tour of the battleship. As flag ship of the Home Fleet, the Dreadnought was a high-profile target for the pranksters in opposing this new killing machine, and as such the hoax attracted much attention in the press once discovered.

== Career in art ==
Grant is best known for his painting style, which developed in the wake of French post-impressionist exhibitions mounted in London in 1910. He often worked with, and was influenced by, another member of the group, art critic and artist Roger Fry. As well as painting landscapes and portraits, Fry designed textiles and ceramics.

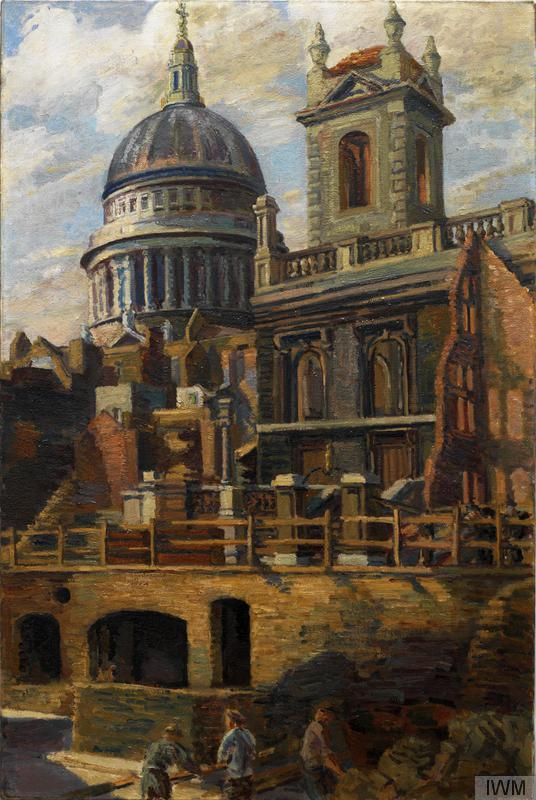
St Paul's 1941 (Imperial War Museum)

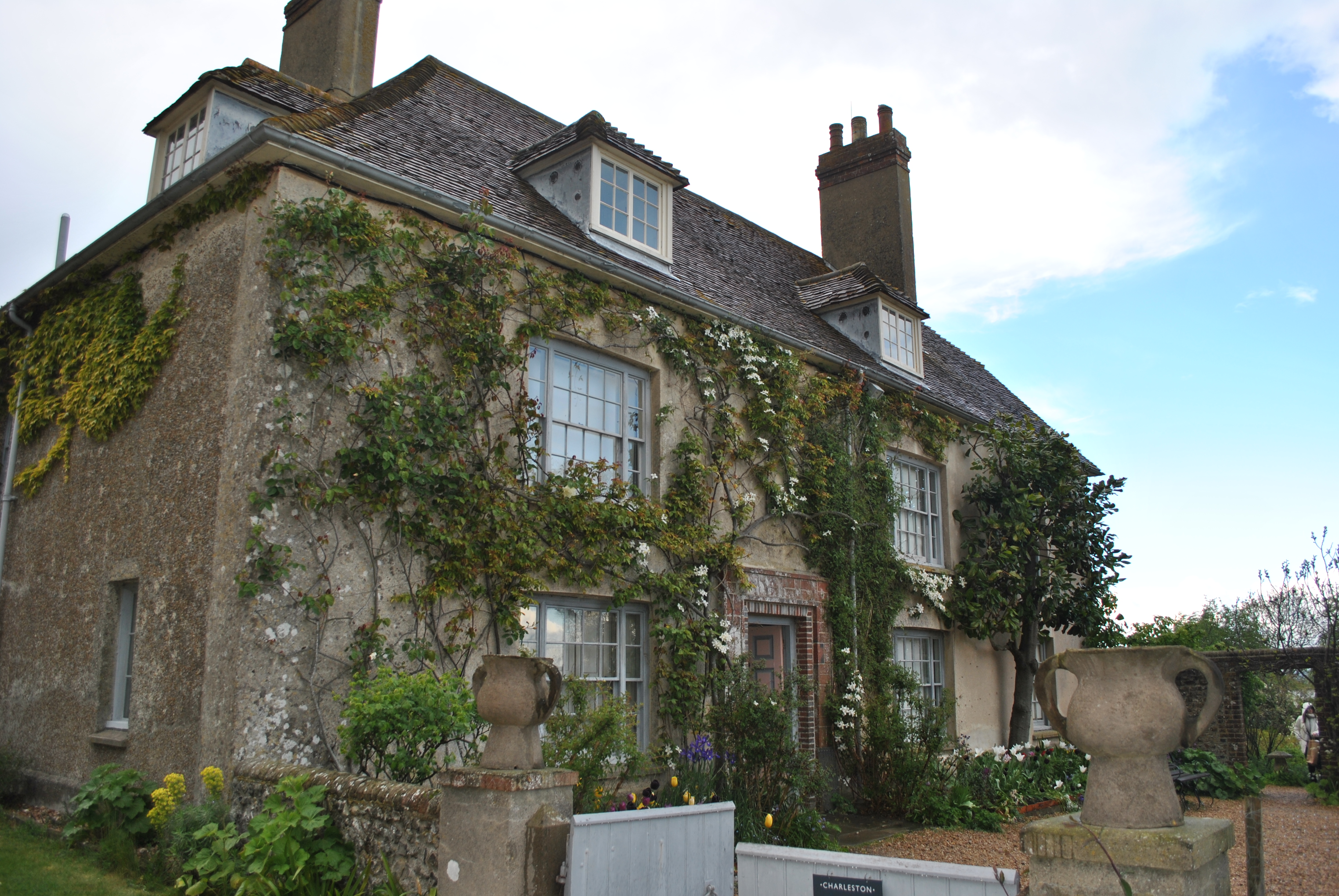
Charleston Farmhouse, Firle, 2017

After Fry founded the Omega Workshops in 1913, Grant became co-director with Vanessa Bell, who was then involved with Fry. Grant had been living just a few doors down from the Omega Workshop at 21 Fitzroy Square which, in 1912 he left and recommended it to another friend of the artist group, Derwent Lees, teacher at the Slade. Although Grant had always been actively homosexual, a relationship with Vanessa blossomed, which was both creative and personal, and he eventually moved in with her and her two sons by her husband Clive Bell. In 1916, in support of his application for recognition as a conscientious objector, Grant joined his new lover, David Garnett, in setting up as fruit farmers in Suffolk. Both their applications were initially unsuccessful, but eventually the Central Tribunal agreed to recognise them on condition of their finding more appropriate premises. Vanessa Bell found the house named Charleston near Firle in Sussex. Relationships with Clive Bell remained amicable, and Bell stayed with them for long periods fairly often – sometimes accompanied by his own mistress, Mary Hutchinson.

Between 1932 and 1934 Grant and Bell created the 50-piece Famous Women Dinner Service at Charleston, commissioned by the art historian and museum director Kenneth Clark.

In 1935, Grant was selected along with nearly 30 other prominent British artists of the day to provide works of art for the RMS Queen Mary then being built in Scotland. Grant was commissioned to provide paintings and fabrics for the first class Main Lounge. In early 1936, after his work was installed in the Lounge, directors from the Cunard Line made a walk-through inspection of the ship. When they saw what Grant had created, they immediately rejected his works and ordered it removed.

Grant is quoted in the book The Mary: The Inevitable Ship, by Potter and Frost, as saying:

"I was not only to paint some large murals to go over the fireplaces, but arrange for the carpets, curtains, textiles, all of which were to be chosen or designed by me. After my initial designs had been passed by the committee I worked on the actual designs for four months. I was then told the committee objected to the scale of the figures on the panels. I consented to alter these, and although it entailed considerable changes, I got a written assurance that I should not be asked to make further alterations. I carried on, and from that time my work was seen constantly by the Company's (Cunard's) representative.

When it was all ready I sent the panels to the ship to put the finishing touches to them when hanging. A few days later I received a visit from the Company's man, who told me that the chairman had, on his own authority, turned down the panels, refusing to give any reason.

From then on, nothing went right. My carpet designs were rejected and my textiles were not required. The whole thing had taken me about a year..... I never got any reason for the rejection of my work. The company simply said they were not suitable, paid my fee, and that was that."

During World War Two, Grant received a short-term commission from the War Artists' Advisory Committee for two paintings, the most notable of which is an image of St Paul's Cathedral during the 1941 London Blitz as seen from the basement of a nearby bombed building.

In the late 1950s Grant was commissioned to decorate the Russell Chantry of Lincoln Cathedral. Grant modelled the figure of Christ in these murals on his lover Paul Roche. The Cathedral authorities closed the Chantry in the 1960s and it was used as a store room for many years. Grants' murals were eventually restored and the space reopened to the public in the 1990s.

== Personal life ==
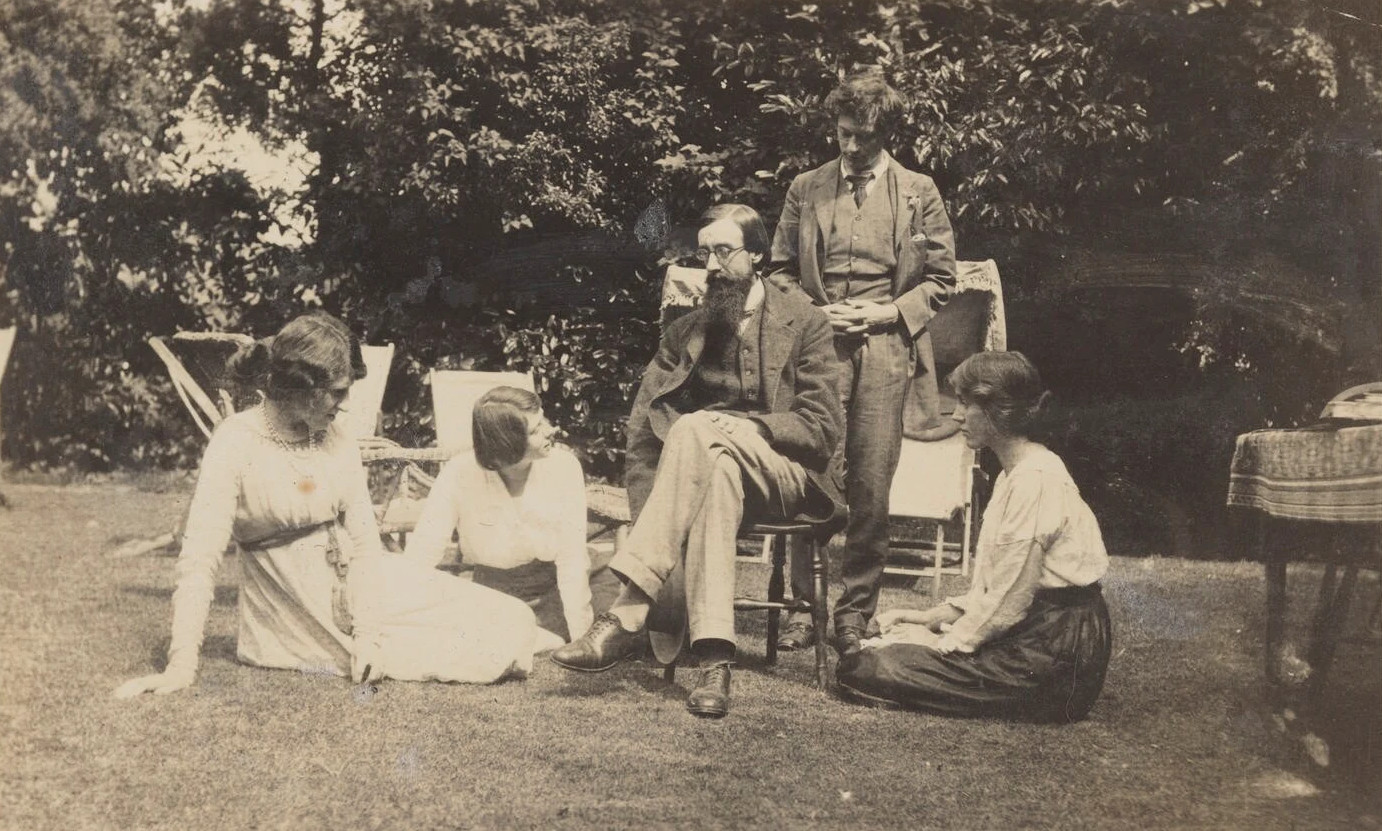
Some of the Bloomsbury members, left to right: Lady Ottoline Morrell, Maria Nys (later Mrs. Aldous Huxley), Lytton Strachey, Duncan Grant, and Vanessa Bell

Grant's early affairs were exclusively homosexual. His lovers included his cousin, the writer Lytton Strachey, the future politician Arthur Hobhouse and the economist John Maynard Keynes, who at one time considered Grant the love of his life because of his good looks and the originality of his mind. Through Strachey, Grant became involved in the Bloomsbury Group, where he made many such great friends including Vanessa Bell. He would eventually live with Vanessa Bell who, though she was a married woman, fell deeply in love with him and, one night, succeeded in seducing him; Bell very much wanted a child by Grant, and she became pregnant in the spring of 1918. Although it is generally assumed that Grant's sexual relations with Bell ended in the months before Angelica was born (Christmas, 1918), they continued to live together for more than 40 years. During that time, their relationship was mainly domestic and creative; they often painted in the same studio together, praising and critiquing each other's work.

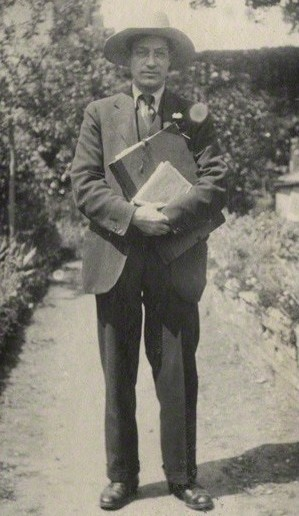
Duncan Grant, 1922

Living with Vanessa Bell was no impediment to Grant's relationships with men, either before or after Angelica was born. Angelica grew up believing that Vanessa's husband Clive Bell was her biological father; she bore his surname and his behaviour toward her never indicated otherwise. Duncan Grant and Vanessa Bell had formed an open relationship, although she herself apparently never had any further affairs. Grant, in contrast, had many physical affairs and several serious relationships with other men, most notably David Garnett, who would one day marry Angelica and have four daughters with her, including Amaryllis Garnett. Grant's love and respect for Bell, however, kept him with her until her death in 1961.

Angelica wrote that Grant was "a homosexual with bisexual leanings".

== Later years ==
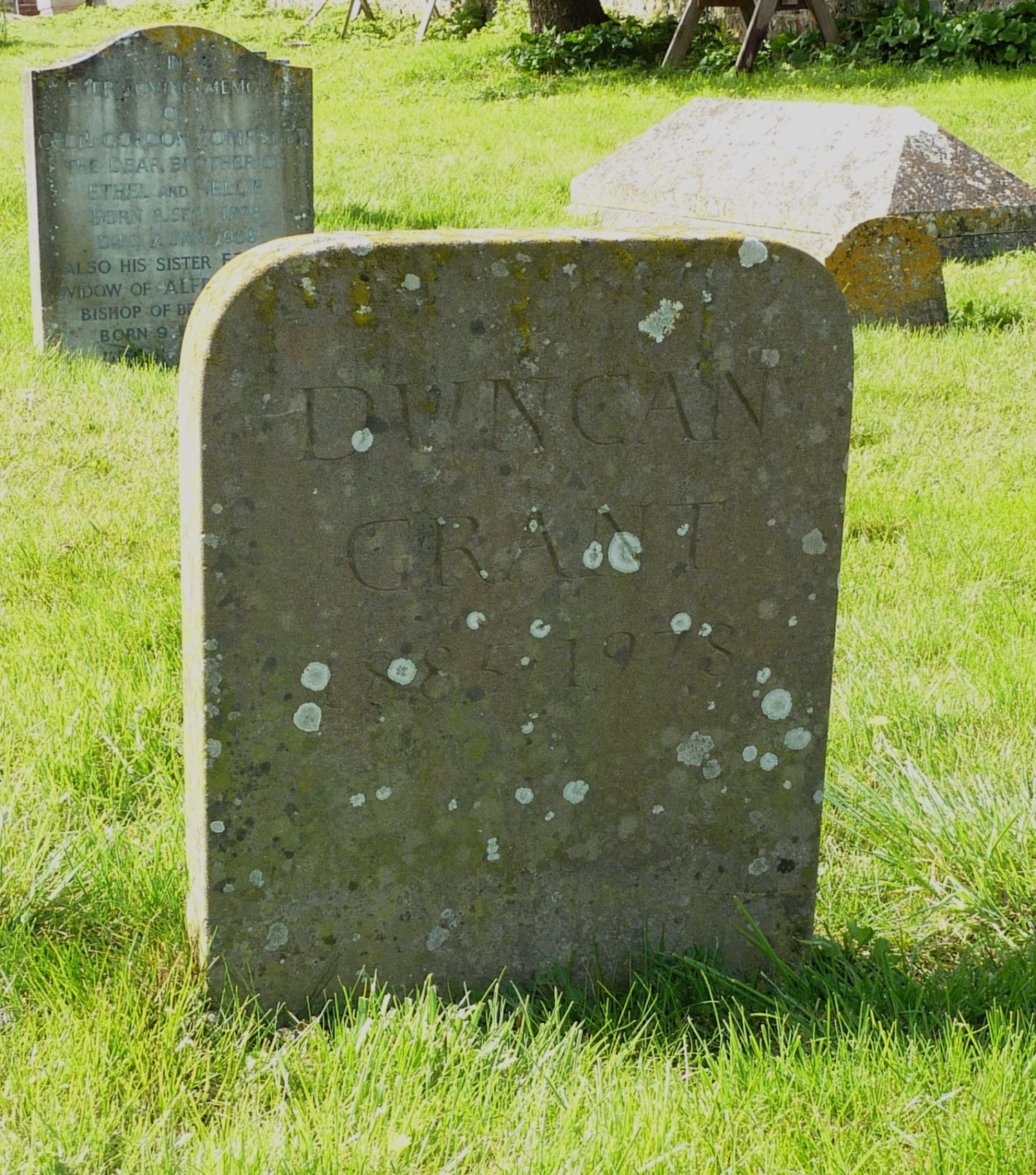
Duncan Grant's grave at St Peter's Church, West Firle, Sussex, photographed in 2013

In Grant's later years, his lover, the poet Paul Roche (1916–2007), whom he had known since 1946, took care of him and enabled Grant to maintain his accustomed way of life at Charleston for many years. Grant and Roche's relationship was strong and lasted even during Roche's marriage and five children he had by the late 1950s. Roche was made co-heir of Grant's estate. Grant eventually died in Roche's home in 1978.

Duncan Grant's remains are buried beside Vanessa Bell's in the churchyard of St Peter's Church, Firle, East Sussex.

== Literary references ==
Duncan Grant is referenced with Isadora Duncan and Mary Garden in A Drunk Man Looks at the Thistle (1926) by Hugh MacDiarmid (lines 30–32).

== See also ==
- List of Bloomsbury Group people
