= Strachey =

- Place of origin: Saffron Walden, Essex, England
- Titles: Baronet Strachey; Baron Strachie

The Strachey family (/ˈstreɪtʃi/ STRAY-chee) originated in Saffron Walden, Essex, England. By the mid-1600s, they were based at Sutton Court in Stowey, Somerset, England.

== Strachey family ==
- William Strachey the English writer
  - William Strachey (c. 1596/97–1635)
    - John Strachey (d. 1674), friend of John Locke
      - John Strachey (geologist) (1671–1743), British geologist
        - Thomas Strachey (1699–1740) served in the British Royal Navy.
          - Susannah Strachey married Edmund Harper.
            - Tristram Harper (1760–1842)
              - Harriette Strachey Harper (1802–1889) married John Shephard (1791–1878)
                - Sir Horatio Hale Shephard (1842–1921), British lawyer
                  - Brigadier-General Gordon Strachey Shephard (1885–1918), Royal Flying Corps commander
              - Rev. Henry John Chitty Harper (1804–1893), Anglican bishop
                - Emily Weddell Harper (1830–1950) married John Barton Arundel Acland (1823-1904).
                  - Sir Hugh Thomas Dyke Acland (1874–1956), New Zealand surgeon
                    - Sir Hugh John Dyke "Jack" Acland (1904–1981), New Zealand politician
                - Mary Anna Harper (1832–1924) married Charles Robert Blakiston (1825–1898).
                - Ven. Henry William Harper (1833–1922), Anglican priest
                - Ellen Shephard Harper (1834–1916) married Charles George Tripp (1826–1897).
                - Leonard Harper (1837–1915), New Zealand politician
                  - Arthur Paul Harper (1865–1955), New Zealand lawyer
                - Sir George Harper (1843–1937), New Zealand lawyer
                  - Eric Tristram Harper (1877–1918), New Zealand rugby player
        - Henry Strachey of Sutton Court, Somerset
          - Sir Henry Strachey, 1st Baronet (1737–1810), British politician and civil servant
            - Sir Henry Strachey, 2nd Baronet (1772–1858)
            - Edward Strachey (1774–1832) was in the service of the East India Company.
              - Sir Edward Strachey, 3rd Baronet (1812–1901)
                - Edward Strachey, 1st Baron Strachie (1858–1936), Liberal politician
                  - Edward Strachey, 2nd Baron Strachie (1882–1973)
                  - Frances Constance Maddalena (d.1931) was the first wife of Maurice Towneley-O'Hagan, 3rd Baron O'Hagan (1882–1961), British Liberal politician.
                    - Major Thomas Anthony Edward Towneley Strachey (died 1955), who changed his surname by deed poll to Strachey in September 1938, by which name his progeny are known.
                      - Charles Strachey, 4th Baron O'Hagan (1945–2025), British Conservative politician
                - John St. Loe Strachey (1860–1927), journalist and newspaper proprietor
                  - John Strachey (politician) (1901–1963), British politician
                    - Charles Strachey, presumed 6th Baronet (1934–2014)
                - Henry Strachey (artist) (1863–1940), painter, art critic and writer
              - Henry Strachey (explorer) (1816–1912) served in India as an officer in the Bengal Army and was responsible for surveying large portions of western Tibet.
                - Julia Charlotte Chance married in 1884 barrister William Chance (later 2nd Baronet Chance), of the wealthy family which owned the glassmaking company Chance Brothers. The couple's residence, Orchards, Surrey, was designed for them by Edwin Lutyens.
              - Richard Strachey (1817–1908) was the husband of the suffragette Jane Maria Strachey (1840–1928) and father of 10 surviving children, including:
                - Lytton Strachey (1880–1932) was a writer and thinker and among his prominent works are Eminent Victorians and a celebrated biography of Queen Victoria.
                - Pernel Strachey (1876–1951), scholar and educationist and the principal of Newnham College, Cambridge.
                - James Strachey (1887–1967), a psychoanalyst and biographer of Sigmund Freud, married psychoanalyst Alix Strachey (1892–1973).
                - Oliver Strachey (1874–1960) was a writer and cryptoanalyst and worked at Bletchley Park during WWII. His wives were Ruby Mayer and the feminist Ray Costelloe Strachey (1887–1940). He had three children:
                  - Julia Strachey (1901–1979), writer; daughter of Oliver and his first wife Ruby Mayer
                  - Barbara Strachey (1912–1999), writer; daughter of Oliver and his second wife Ray
                  - Christopher Strachey (1916–1975), computer scientist; son of Oliver and his second wife Ray
                - Dorothy Bussy (née Strachey) (1865–1960), wife of French painter Simon Bussy, wrote one novel, Olivia, about a lesbian relationship.
                - Pippa Strachey (1872–1968), suffragist and feminist
              - John Strachey (civil servant) (1823–1907) served as an administrator in India. He married Katherine Batten and had eight children, including:
                - Sir Arthur Strachey (1858–1901) served as a judge in India.
                - Winifred Barnes was the wife of Indian civil servant Hugh Shakespear Barnes.
                  - Mary Barnes (1889–1977) married St John Hutchinson (1884–1942).
                    - Jeremy Hutchinson, Baron Hutchinson of Lullington (1915–2017), British barrister
                    - Barbara Judith Barnes married Nathaniel Mayer Victor Rothschild, 3rd Baron Rothschild (1910–1990).
                  - James Strachey Barnes (1890–1955), British theorist of Fascism
                - Charles Strachey
                  - Jack Strachey (1894–1972), English composer and songwriter
            - Richard Strachey (1781–1847)
              - Mary Augusta Strachey (1838–1914), English co-author of The Great Book-Collectors, married Charles Isaac Elton (1839–1900).
              - Isabel Strachey (1845–1920) married John Holland Baker (1841–1930).
                - Noeline Baker (1878–1958), New Zealand suffragist
