= Richard Strachey =

English officer and civil servant (1817–1908)

Sir Richard Strachey GCSI FRS FRGS
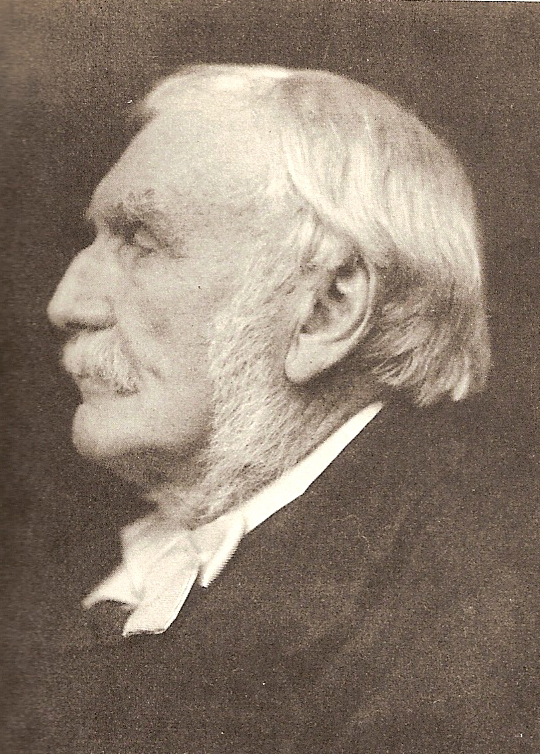

President of the Royal Geographical Society
- In office 23 May 1887 – 27 May 1889
- Preceded by: The Marquess of Lorne
- Succeeded by: Sir Mountstuart Duff

Personal details
- Born: 24 July 1817 Stowey, Somerset, England
- Died: 12 February 1908 (aged 90) Camden, London, England
- Spouse: Jane Maria Grant (1859–1908; his death)
- Children: 13, including Lytton, James, Dorothy, Pernel, and Oliver
- Relatives: Sir Henry Strachey (grandfather)

Military service
- Branch: British Indian Army
- Rank: Lieutenant-general
- Wars: First Anglo-Sikh War

Sir Richard Strachey GCSI FRS FRGS (24 July 1817 – 12 February 1908) was a British soldier and Indian administrator, the third son of Edward Strachey and grandson of Sir Henry Strachey, 1st Baronet.

== Early life ==
He was born on 24 July 1817, at Sutton Court, Stowey, Somerset. From Addiscombe Military Seminary he passed into the Bengal Engineers in 1836, and was employed for some years on irrigation works in the North-Western Provinces. So many members of the family were in the Indian government that sarcastic mentions were made of the "Government of the Stracheys".

== Career ==
Strachey served in the First Anglo-Sikh War of 1845–46, and was at the battles of Aliwal and Sobraon, was mentioned in dispatches, and received a brevet-majority.

In 1848, with J. E. Winterbottom, he entered Tibet to explore Lakes Manasarovar and Rakshastal, which his brother Henry Strachey had visited in 1846. In 1849, the two brothers briefly re-entered Tibet by following the Niti Pass out of Garhwal.

From 1858 to 1865 he was chiefly employed in the public works department, either as acting or permanent secretary to the government of India, and from 1867 to 1871 he filled the post of director-general of irrigation, then specially created. It was thought that he would be made secretary to the department of agriculture but Allan Octavian Hume was appointed to it in 1870.

During this period the entire administration of public works was reorganised to adapt it to the increasing magnitude of the interests with which this department had to deal since its establishment by Lord Dalhousie in 1854. For this reorganisation, under which the accounts were placed on a proper footing and the forest administration greatly developed, Strachey was chiefly responsible. His work in connection with Indian finance was important. In 1867 he prepared a scheme in considerable detail for decentralising the financial administration of India, which formed the basis of the policy afterwards carried into effect by his brother Sir John Strachey under Lord Mayo and Lord Lytton.

He left India in 1871, but in 1877 he was sent there to confer with the government on the purchase of the East Indian railway, and was then selected as president of the commission of inquiry into Indian famines. In 1878 he was appointed to act for six months as financial member of the governor-general's council, when he made proposals for meeting the difficulties arising from the depreciation of the rupee, then just beginning to be serious. These proposals did not meet with the support of the secretary of state. From that time he continued to take an active part in the efforts made to bring the currencies of India and England into harmony, until in 1892 he was appointed a member of Lord Herschell's committee, which arrived at conclusions in accordance with the views put forward by him in 1878.

In 1892, Strachey attended the International Monetary Conference at Brussels as delegate for British India. He was a member of the council of the Secretary of State for India from 1875 to 1889, when he resigned his seat to accept the post of chairman of the East Indian Railway Company.

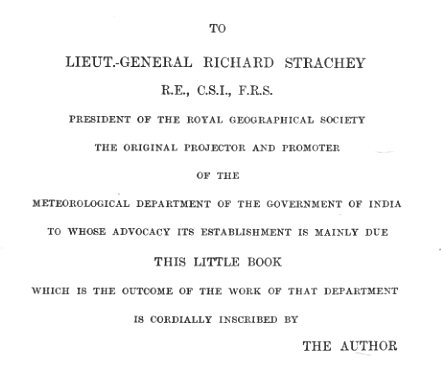
Dedication of 1889 meteorology department book by Henry Francis Blanford

Strachey's scientific labours in connection with the geology, botany and physical geography of the Himalayas were considerable. He devoted much time to meteorological research, was largely instrumental in the formation of the Indian meteorological department, and became chairman of the meteorological council of the Royal Society in 1883. From 1888 to 1890 he was president of the Royal Geographical Society. In 1897 he was awarded one of the Royal Medals of the Royal Society, of which he became a fellow in 1854; and in the same year he was created GCSI. He died on 12 February 1908.

Strachey did much good work for the Royal Society, served on its council four times, from 1872 to 1874, 1880 to 1881, 1884 to 1886, and 1890 to 1891, and was twice a vice-president; he was a member of its meteorological committee (which controlled the meteorological office) in 1867, and he was a member of the council which replaced the committee in 1876, and from 1883 to 1895 was its chairman. From 1873 he was on the committee of the Royal Society for managing the Kew observatory. The royal medal of the society was bestowed upon him in 1897 for his researches in physical and botanical geography and in meteorology, and the Royal Meteorological Society awarded him the Symons medal in 1906. His most important scientific contributions to knowledge were made in meteorology. He laid the foundations of the scientific study of Indian meteorology, organising a department whose labours have been of use in assisting to forecast droughts and consequent scarcity and of no little advantage to meteorologists generally. For years he served on the committee of solar physics. A sound mathematician, Strachey delighted in mechanical inventions and especially in designing instruments to give graphic expression to formulas he had devised for working out meteorological problems. In 1884 he designed an instrument called the 'sine curve developer' to show in a graphic form the results obtained by applying to hourly readings of barograms and thermograms his formula for the calculation of harmonic coefficients. In 1888 and 1890 he designed two 'slide rules,' one to facilitate the computation of the amplitude and time of maximum of harmonic constants from values obtained by applying his formula to hourly readings of barograms and thermograms; the other to obtain the height of clouds from measurements of two photographs taken simultaneously with cameras placed at the ends of a base line half a mile in length. A further invention was a portable and very simple instrument, called a 'nephoscope,' for observing the direction of motion of high cirrus clouds, whose movement is generally too slow to allow of its direction being determined by the unaided eye.

== Personal life ==
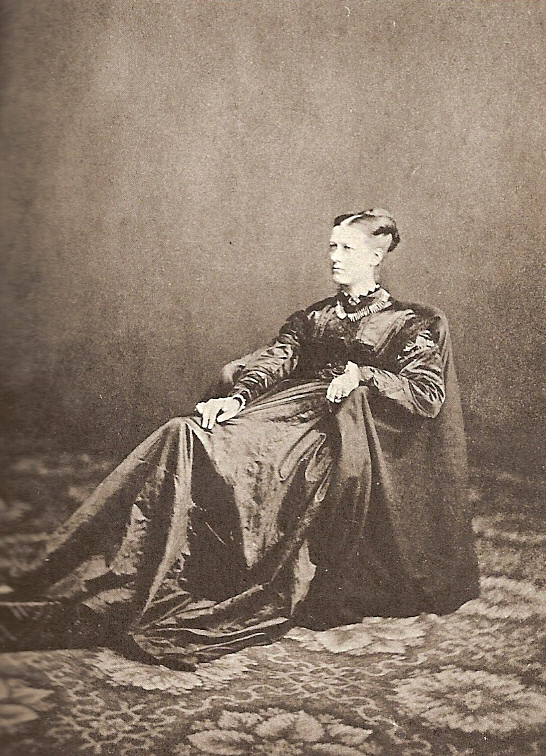
Lady Strachey

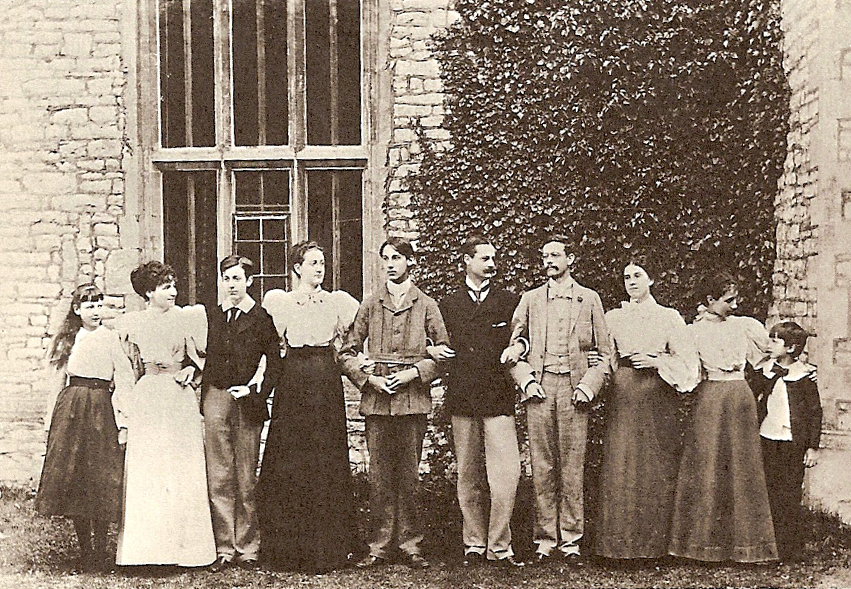
Sons and daughters of Sir Richard and Lady Strachey. Left to right: Marjorie, Dorothy, Lytton, Joan Pernel, Oliver, Dick, Ralph, Philippa, Elinor, James.

Strachey was about 37 years old when he married Caroline Bowles, who died in 1855, within a year of their wedding.

Nearly four years were to pass before he married again. On 4 January 1859, the 42-year-old Richard married 18-year-old Jane Maria Grant, to be known henceforth as Jane, Lady Strachey (1840–1928). His wife was to become a well-known author and supporter of women's suffrage, who would co-lead the Mud March of 1907 in London. Sir Richard and Lady Strachey were the parents of thirteen children, of whom ten survived to adulthood; among them were:

- Dorothy Bussy (née Strachey) (1865–1960), wife of French painter Simon Bussy; she wrote one novel, Olivia, about a lesbian relationship
- Pippa Strachey (1872–1968), suffragist and feminist
- Oliver Strachey (1874–1960), writer and cryptoanalyst; worked at Bletchley Park during WWII. His wives were Ruby Mayers and the feminist Ray Costelloe Strachey (1887–1940).
- Pernel Strachey (1876–1951), scholar and educationist; principal of Newnham College, Cambridge
- Lytton Strachey (1880–1932), writer and thinker; among his prominent works are Eminent Victorians and a celebrated biography of Queen Victoria
- Marjorie Strachey (1882–1964), Newnham graduate and author
- James Strachey (1887–1967), psychoanalyst and biographer of Sigmund Freud; husband of psychoanalyst Alix Strachey (1892–1973)

== See also ==
- Strachey baronets

== Other sources ==
- This article incorporates text from a publication now in the public domain: Vetch, Robert Hamilton (1912). "Strachey, Richard". In Lee, Sidney (ed.). Dictionary of National Biography (2nd supplement). Vol. 3. London: Smith, Elder & Co. pp. 439–432.
- Betty Askwith (1971) Two Victorian Families. London: Chatto & Windus. ISBN 0-7011-1804-0.
- Sabyasachi Bhattacharya (2005) The Financial Foundations of the British Raj. Orient Longman. ISBN 81-250-2903-6.
- Barbara Caine (2005) Bombay to Bloomsbury: A Biography of the Strachey Family. Oxford University Press. ISBN 0-19-925034-0.
