= Ray Strachey =

British feminist activist and writer (1887–1940)

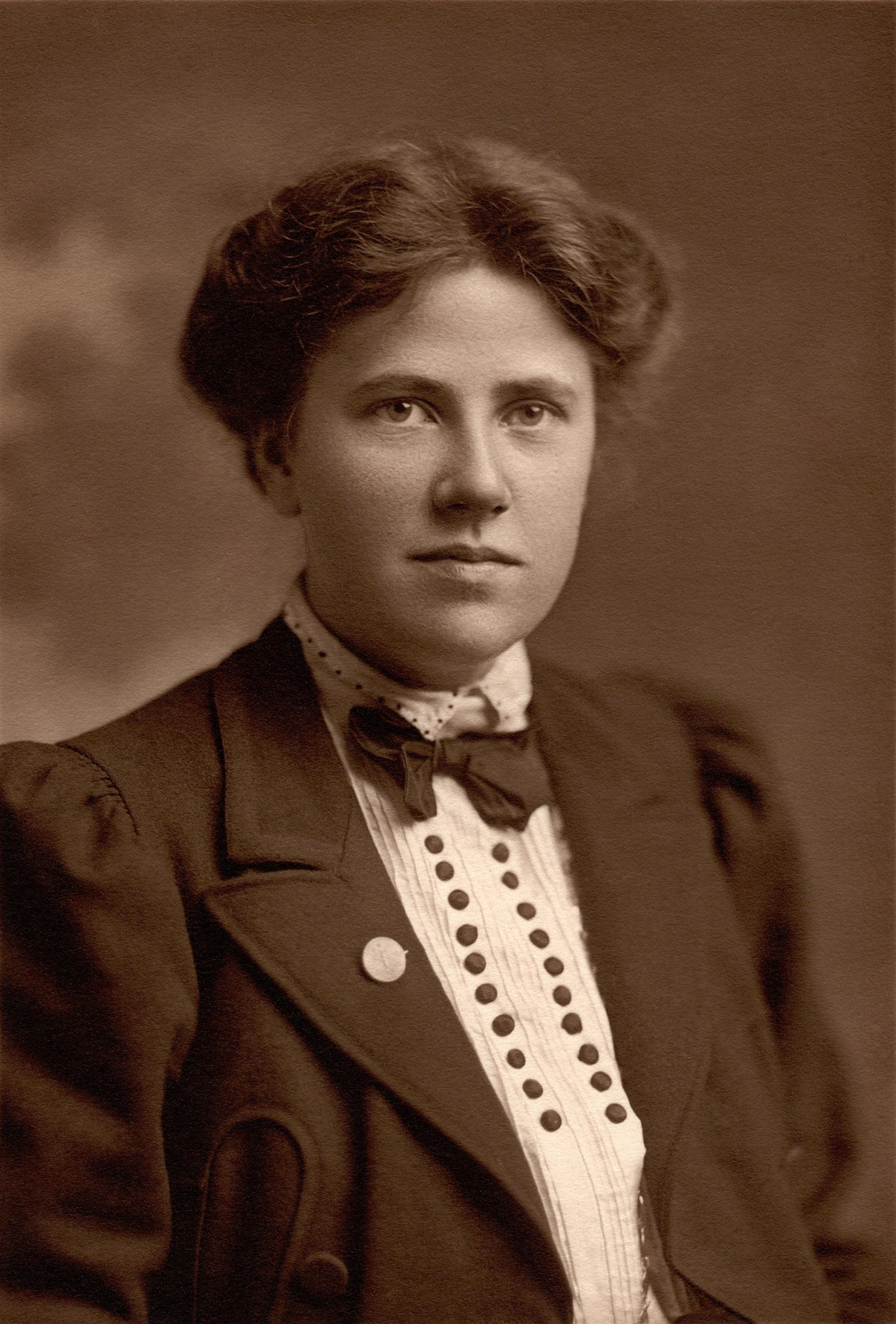
- Born: Rachel Pearsall Conn Costelloe; 4 June 1887; London, England
- Died: 16 July 1940 (aged 53); Royal Free Hospital, London, England
- Education: Newnham College
- Spouse: Oliver Strachey
- Children: Barbara and Christopher
- Parent(s): Mary Berenson; Benjamin Conn "Frank" Costelloe

Ray Strachey (born Rachel Pearsall Conn Costelloe; 4 June 1887 – 16 July 1940) was an English feminist politician, artist and writer.

== Early life ==
Her father was Irish barrister Benjamin "Frank" Conn Costelloe, and her mother was art historian Mary Berenson. She was the elder of the two girls in her family. Her younger sister was the psychologist Karin Stephen, née Costelloe, who married Adrian Stephen, Virginia Woolf's younger brother, in 1914. Ray was educated at Kensington high school and at Newnham College, Cambridge, where she achieved third class in part one of the mathematical tripos (1908).

Like some other female Mathematics graduates of the time, such as Margaret Dorothea Rowbotham and Margaret Partridge, Strachey developed an interest in engineering. She was discouraged by her mother Mary Berenson but nevertheless she took an electrical engineering class at Oxford University in 1910 and planned to study electrical engineering at the Technical College of the City and Guilds of London Institute in October 1910. She wrote to her aunt "I have decided to go to London next winter for my engineering" and that she had been encouraged and helped by Hertha Ayrton. She abandoned her plan due to marriage, but maintained her involvement with the Society of Women Welders, which she had helped to found.

== Career ==
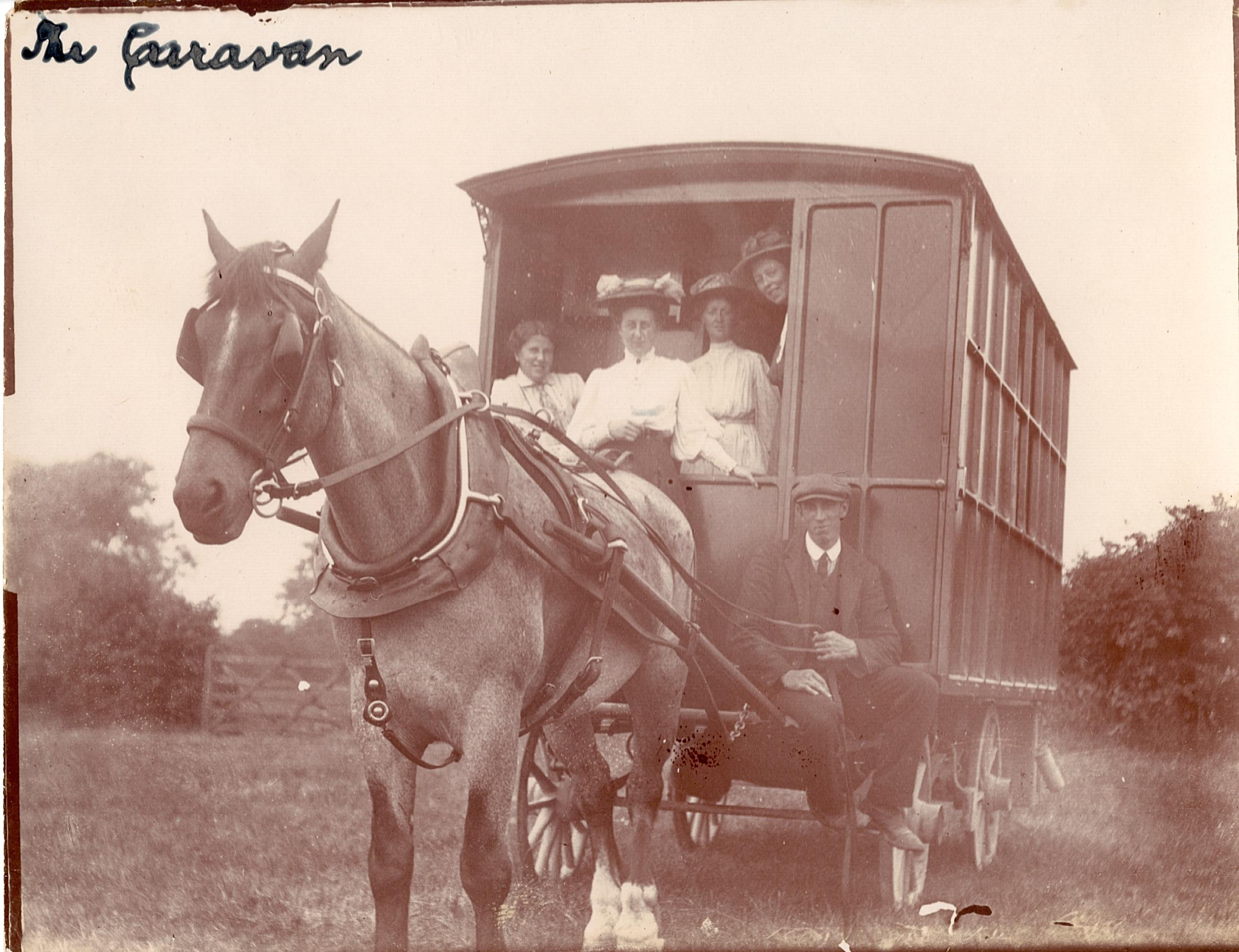
Ray Costelloe and others on the suffrage caravan tour from Scotland to Oxford in 1908

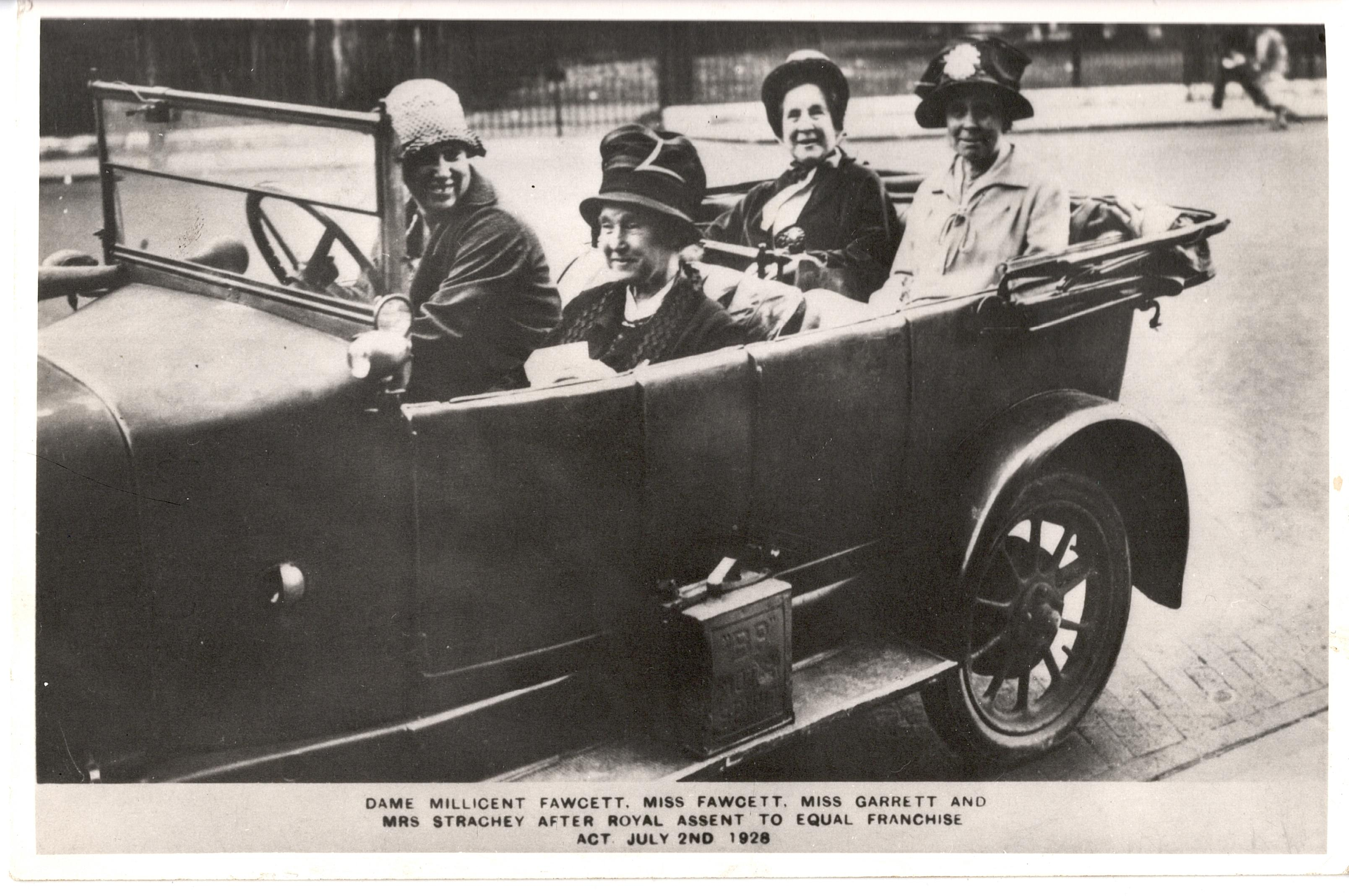
Millicent Fawcett, Agnes Garrett, Miss Fawcett and Ray Strachey after Royal Assent to the Equal Franchise Act in 1928

For most of her life, Strachey worked for women's suffrage organisations, starting when she was studying at Cambridge, when she joined what became known as the Mud March in February 1907 and addressing meetings in summer 1907. She took part in the National Union of Women's Suffrage Societies (NUWSS) Caravan tour in July 1908. The caravan tour was organised by Newnham College students that began in Scotland. The caravan was pulled by a horse and driven by a man. The caravan travelled from place to place and the caravan would by redirected to good places to stay by outriders on bicycles. The caravan had campbeds and a tent that allowed five or six to sleep. They toured into Keswick and the north of England and they would give talks about women's suffrage. The caravan visited Oxford, Stratford and Warwick. They argued the case for women to get the vote, but they avoided talking about their ambitions of getting women to be members of parliament as this was too radical. The women on the caravan included Strachey and EM Gardner. The tour finished in the East Midlands at Derby where they attracted a crowd on 1,000 people.

Most of Strachey's publications are non-fiction and deal with suffrage issues. She is most often remembered for her book The Cause (1928). Her papers are held at The Women's Library at the London School of Economics.

Strachey worked closely with Millicent Fawcett, sharing her Liberal feminist values and opposing any attempt to integrate the suffrage movement with the Labour Party. In 1915 she became parliamentary secretary of the NUWSS, serving in this role until 1920.

Strachey took great interest in the employment of women in engineering occupations. In 1919 women found themselves excluded by law from most jobs in the engineering industry under the Restoration of Pre-War Practices Act 1919. Strachey campaigned on behalf of the Society of Women Welders in 1920 for women to remain in the trade. In 1922 Strachey also created a company to build small mud houses to help the housing shortage, based on a 1922 prototype known as "Copse Cottage" (but referred to as "Mud House". Women were employed to assemble them but there were problems with sourcing the correct clay and the chimney builders refused to co-operate. The Mavat company did exhibit a bungalow in 1925 at the Women's Arts & Crafts Exhibition at Central Hall in London. Strachey was defeated but she found work for all the women involved.

In her book Women's Suffrage and Women's Service she described the setting up by the London Society for Women's Service of a school for Oxy-Acetylene Welding. In 1937 she wrote about women's employment in professional and trade roles in Careers and Openings for Women.

After the Great War, when some women were granted the vote, and women could stand for parliament, she stood as an Independent parliamentary candidate at Brentford and Chiswick on the general elections in 1918, 1922 and 1923, without success. She rejected the attempt by Eleanor Rathbone to establish a broad-based feminist programme in the 1920s. In 1931 she became parliamentary secretary to Britain's first woman MP to take her seat, Nancy Astor, Viscountess Astor, and in 1935 Strachey became the head of the Women's Employment Federation. She also made regular radio broadcasts for the BBC.

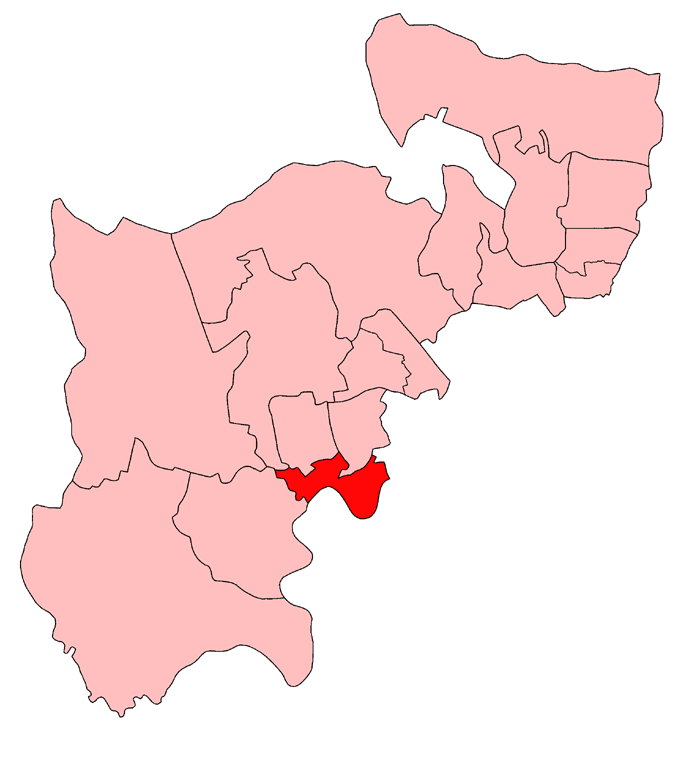
Brentford & Chiswick within the Middlesex, showing boundaries used from 1918 to 1923

General Election 1918: Brentford & Chiswick Electorate 26,409
Party	Candidate	Votes	%	±%
Coalition Unionist	Walter Grant Peterson Morden	9,077		
Labour	William Haywood	2,620		
Independent	Rachel Strachey	1,263		
Majority				
Turnout				
Unionist win				

General Election 1922: Brentford & Chiswick Electorate 27,960
Party	Candidate	Votes	%	±%
Unionist	Walter Grant Peterson Morden	10,150		
Independent	Rachel Strachey	7,804		
Majority				
Turnout				
Unionist hold		Swing		

General Election 1923: Brentford & Chiswick Electorate 28,245
Party	Candidate	Votes	%	±%
Unionist	Walter Grant Peterson Morden	9,648		
Independent	Rachel Strachey	4,828		
Labour	William Haywood	3,216		
Majority				
Turnout				
Unionist hold		Swing		

== Family ==
She married at Cambridge on 31 May 1911 the civil servant Oliver Strachey, with whom she had two children, Barbara (born 1912, later a writer) and Christopher (born 1916, later a pioneer computer scientist). Oliver Strachey was the elder brother of the biographer Lytton Strachey of the Bloomsbury Group; other siblings in the Strachey family included psychoanalyst James Strachey, novelist Dorothy Bussy, and educationist Pernel Strachey. Ray's mother-in-law was Jane Maria Strachey, a well-known author and supporter of women's suffrage who co-led the suffragist Mud March of 1907 in London. Her sister-in-law was the British suffragist, Pippa Strachey.

Strachey's daughter, Barbara, was interviewed about her mother and the wider Strachey family by the historian, Brian Harrison, as part of his Suffrage Interviews project, titled Oral evidence on the suffragette and suffragist movements: the Brian Harrison interviews. There is a three-part interview from January 1977 and a single interview from August 1979. The interviews include reflections on their home, Mud House, and on Ray's relationships with her husband, mother and sister-in-law, Pippa.

Ray and Oliver's niece, Ursula Margaret Wentzel, née Strachey (Ursula's Father, Ralph, was Oliver's brother) was interviewed about Ray (and Pippa) in March 1977 and talks about Ray's Marsham Street home and her practical skills.

== Art ==
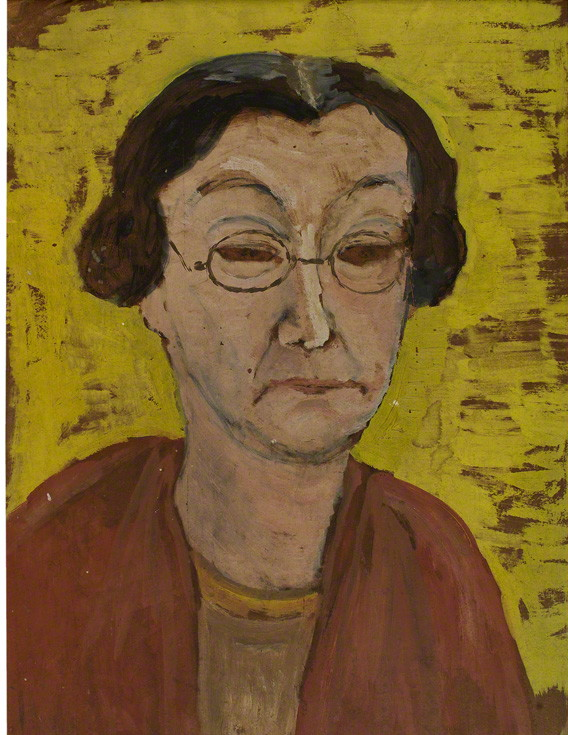
Painting by Ray Strachey of her sister-in-law Pernel Strachey.

Strachey painted her sister-in-law, Pernel Strachey, around the year 1930, and the young Fellow of King's College, Cambridge, Dadie Rylands at about the same time. Both paintings are in the National Portrait Gallery in London.

== Death ==
She died in the Royal Free Hospital in London in her early fifties of heart failure, following an operation to remove a fibroid tumor.

== Posthumous recognition ==
Her name and picture (and those of 58 other women's suffrage supporters) are on the plinth of the statue of Millicent Fawcett in Parliament Square, London, unveiled in April 2018.

== Publications ==
- The World at Eighteen
- Marching On
- Shaken By The Wind

=== Biographies ===
- Frances Willard: Her Life and Work (1913)
- A Quaker Grandmother: Hannah Whitall Smith (1914)
- Millicent Garrett Fawcett (1931)

=== Non-fiction about women's roles ===
- Women's Suffrage and Women's Service: The History of the London and National Society for Women's Service (1927)
- The Cause: A Short History of Women's Movement in Great Britain
- Careers and Openings for Women
- Our Freedom and Its Results
