= Pippa Strachey =

British suffragist

Pippa Strachey CBE
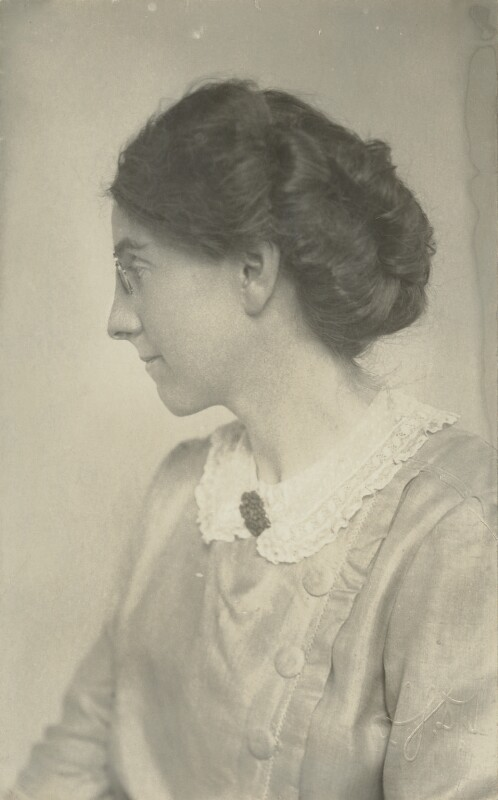
- Pippa Strachey, c. 1900
- Born: Philippa Strachey; 19 April 1872; London, United Kingdom of Great Britain and Ireland
- Died: 23 August 1968 (aged 96); London, United Kingdom
- Education: Allenswood Boarding Academy
- Occupation: Suffragist
- Relatives: Lytton Strachey (brother)

Philippa Strachey, CBE (19 April 1872 – 23 August 1968) was a British suffragist. She organised major suffrage demonstrations and went on to lead the Fawcett Society.

== Life ==
Pippa was born in Knightsbridge as the fifth child of the large Strachey family born to Sir Richard Strachey, colonial administrator and Jane Maria Strachey, writer and suffragist. She was the sister of Pernel, Lytton and Oliver, among others. She was educated partly at home, and partly in Fontainebleau and at Allenswood Boarding Academy in Wimbledon. On leaving school, she largely spent her time on leisure activities, particularly playing the violin.

In 1900, Strachey visited India, and the experience of independence made her decide to seek her own career. She became a teacher at Allenswood for a few years, but then met the feminist Emily Davies, who encouraged her to join the National Union of Women's Suffrage Societies (NUWSS). Strachey's mother, Jane, was a friend of Millicent Fawcett and was already active in the NUWSS, so it was relatively easy for Pippa to become a committee member, then in 1907 to become secretary of the organisation. One of her first tasks was the organisation of the "Mud March"; this was deemed so successful, that she thereafter planned all the group's demonstrations. Pippa's and her sister-in-law, Ray Strachey were both involved in the suffrage movement.

Strachey supported World War I, but was unable to work in field hospitals due to her health. Instead, she worked with Ray Strachey, with a particular focus on finding women good work opportunities. As a result, they founded the Women's Service Bureau, with Pippa as its unpaid secretary. She continued after the war as it became the London Society for Women's Service and, eventually, the Fawcett Society. Under her leadership, the organisation created a substantial library and purchased a building to use as a social club and headquarters.

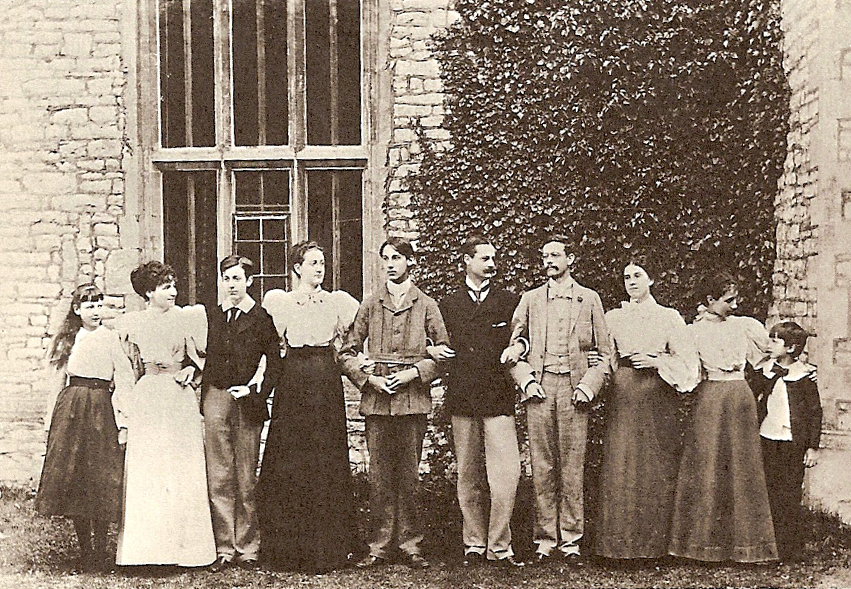
Strachey with her siblings. Left to right: Marjorie, Dorothea, Lytton, Joan Pernel, Oliver, Dick, Ralph, Pippa, Elinor, and James.

Strachey remained close to her family. She nursed her mother in the 1920s, and in 1932 nursed her brother Lytton through his final illness. She was made a Commander of the Order of the British Empire in 1951, and finally retired that year as secretary of the Fawcett Society. She remained close to women's activism, being on the first page of 80,000 signatories of the 'Equal Pay in the public services' petition presented on behalf of the Equal Pay Campaign Committee to Parliament on 9 March 1954. She spent her remaining years working through family papers.

She never married and died on 23 August 1968 in London. Pippa’s niece, Ursula Margaret Wentzel, nee Strachey (Ursula’s Father, Ralph, was Pippa’s brother) was interviewed about Pippa (and Ray) in March 1977 by the historian, Brian Harrison, as part of his Suffrage Interviews project, titled Oral evidence on the suffragette and suffragist movements: the Brian Harrison interviews. Wentzel talked about Pippa’s speaking style, ability to mix with all social classes, and her old age.
