= Journeys of Frodo =

Book by Barbara Strachey

Journeys of Frodo: An Atlas of J. R. R. Tolkien's The Lord of the Rings
- Cover
- Author: Barbara Strachey
- Subject: The Lord of the Rings
- Genre: Middle-earth
- Publisher: George Allen & Unwin (UK)
- Publication date: 1981
- ISBN: 0-04-912016-6
- OCLC: 9160102

Journeys of Frodo: An Atlas of J. R. R. Tolkien's The Lord of the Rings by Barbara Strachey is an atlas based on the fictional realm of Middle-earth, which traces the journeys undertaken by the characters in Tolkien's epic.

The book comprises 51 two-colour maps (a general map of Middle-earth and 50 numbered maps) at various scales, all based on the original The Lord of the Rings maps drawn by Christopher Tolkien from his father's sketches. Each map is on a right-hand page in landscape format and depicts physical features in black and contour lines in red. Routes taken by characters on roads and paths are shown in dashed black and red; routes off-road are in red only. Arrows show the direction of travel and dates are listed in red. Scales along the top and left of each map show the distance east/west (mainly east) and north/south (mainly south) from Bag End. At the bottom of each map is a scale showing miles to the inch and an indication of the lunar phase or phases visible at the dates given.

Each numbered map is accompanied by a description on the facing left-hand page, in which Strachey describes the portion of the route indicated, often justifying her topographical decisions with quotes from the book. In some cases she points out discrepancies in the topographical descriptions, occasionally for instance altering the course of a road or a river on the grounds that it would otherwise be inconsistent with Tolkien's other descriptions of the terrain.

== Reception ==
Christopher Tolkien refers to Journeys of Frodo a number of times in The History of The Lord of the Rings, often agreeing with Strachey's conclusions, and sometimes disagreeing.

Nancy-Lou Patterson, reviewing the work in Mythlore, calls it a "delightful contribution" to the understanding of The Lord of the Rings, agreeing with Strachey's comment that when she first read the novel, she wished she had had "a complete set of maps covering the journeys of Frodo and his companions". Patterson writes that Strachey's maps "with their charming directness and laconic simplicity, come very close to the spirit of Tolkien's own line drawings, and form a genuine visual parallel to his novels".

Ian Lace, reviewing the book for MusicWeb, called the book a remarkable piece of useful Middle-earth/Hobbit scholarship. He writes that Strachey has combined information from the texts, Tolkien's maps, and clues such as the phases of the moon.

== See also ==
- The Atlas of Middle-earth
