= Claudine at School =

1900 book by Sidonie-Gabrielle Colette

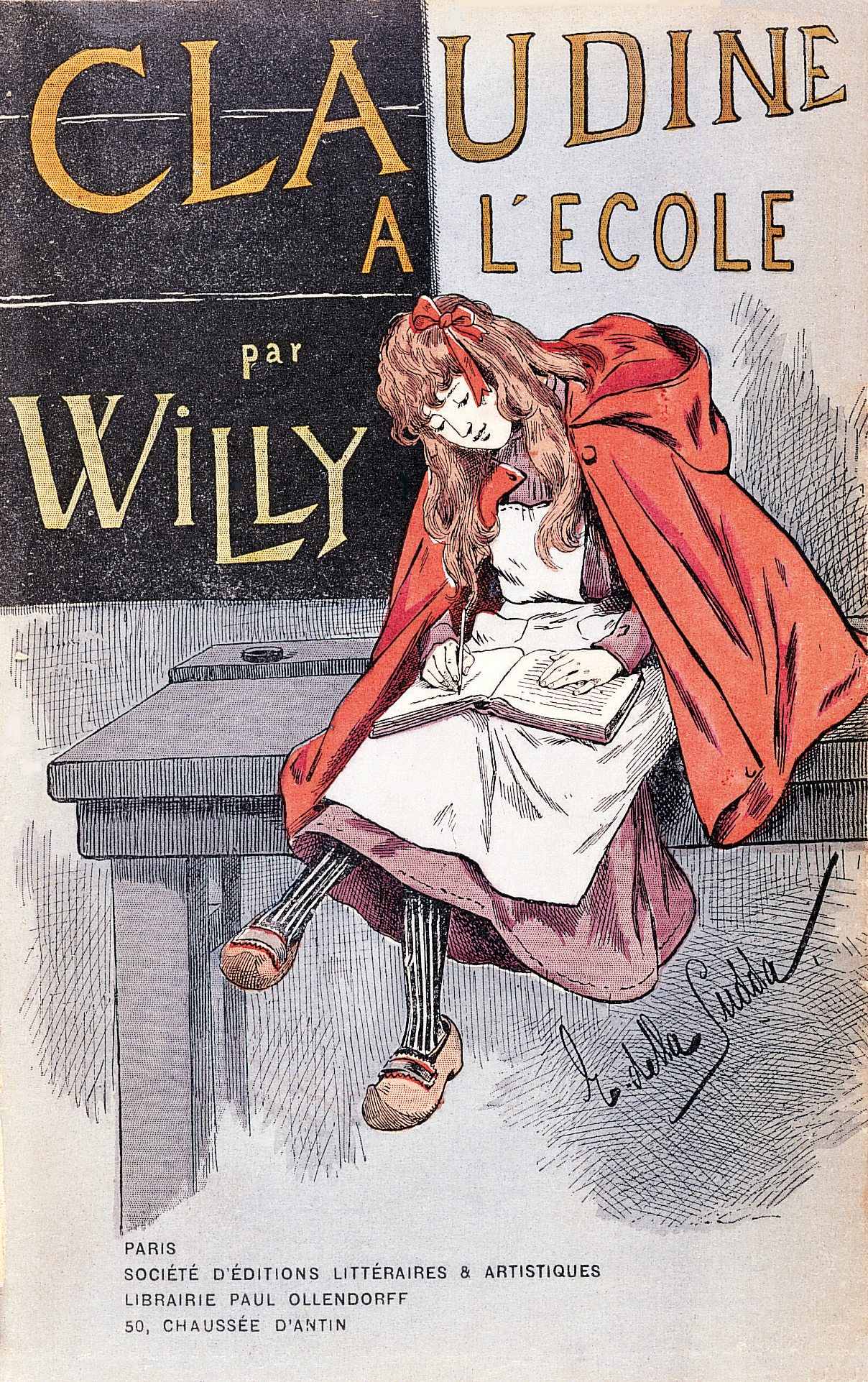
- First edition cover of Claudine à l'école with Willy as author
- Author: Colette
- Original title: Claudine à l'école
- Translator: Antonia White
- Language: French
- Series: Claudine
- Genre: coming-of-age
- Publisher: Willy (1st edition)
- Publication date: 1900
- Publication place: France
- English publication date: 1957
- Media type: Print

Claudine at School (French: Claudine à l'école) is a 1900 novel by the French writer Colette. The narrative recounts the final year of secondary school of 15-year-old Claudine, her brazen confrontations with her headmistress, Mlle Sergent, and her fellow students. It was Colette's first published novel, originally attributed to her first husband, the writer Willy. The work is assumed to be highly autobiographical and includes lyrical descriptions of the Burgundian countryside, where Colette grew up.

== Plot ==
Claudine, a fifteen-year-old girl, lives in Montigny, with her father, who is more interested in mollusks than in his daughter. Claudine attends the small village school, which is the primary location of her many adventures, presented as an intimate journal. The journal begins with the new school year, marked by the arrival of the new headmistress, Miss Sergent, and her assistant, Miss Aimée Lanthenay, as well as the boys' instructors, Mr. Duplessis and Mr. Rabastens. Although Claudine begins an affair early on with Miss Lanthenay, Miss Sergent soon discovers the liaison and discourages Miss Lanthenay, ultimately taking her on as her own lover. Claudine feels betrayed and causes trouble for the two women with the help of her friends, cynical Anaïs and childlike Marie Belhomme. Miss Lanthenay's sister Luce arrives at school, and Claudine mistreats her, but Luce idolizes Claudine nonetheless. Some major events of the school year documented in the novel are the final exams, the opening of the new school, and a ball to mark the visit of an important political minister to the town.

The ball is in full swing when Miss Sergent's mother suddenly throws a man's shoe downstairs into the parlor from the living quarters upstairs. Everyone is silent downstairs as the elder Sergent yells at her daughter for disgracing the family by sleeping with the superintendent of the school district. Miss Sergent's attraction to the man had been mentioned earlier by Claudine, who dismissed it when Sergent stole Aimée away from her. Publicly humiliated, Miss Lanthenay runs off crying while Luce and Claudine laugh.

The novel ends with Claudine saying goodbye to her schooldays and preparing to enter the world, wondering if she'll ever again have as much fun as she had at school.

== Major themes ==
Claudine at School as well as being a coming of age story is an example of homoerotic fiction in the tradition of Gertrude Stein's Fernhurst (1904), Ivy Compton-Burnett's More Women than Men (1934), Christa Winsloe's The Child Manuela (1933), or Dorothy Bussy's Olivia (1949).

== Reception ==
Upon its publication in 1900, Colette's novel was heralded by Charles Marras for its "maturity of language and style". It was immediately successful, yet it brought Colette scandal as well.

== Film, TV or theatrical adaptations ==
Claudine at School has had several French film adaptations.

- Claudine à l'école (1917)
- Claudine at School (1937)
- Claudine à l'école (1978 – made for TV)

On August 7, 1910, the New York Times reported: "Paris, Aug. 6. – G. P. Centenini, in conjunction with Gabriel Astruc, has obtained from Rudolph Berger the right of representation in the United States of Berger's operetta Claudine, the libretto of which is based on a series of lively French novels by Willy, which have had considerable vogue. Berger is a Viennese and Parisian combined. He has written many popular waltzes, of one of which 2,000,000 copies were sold in a year. Claudine will be produced in Paris at the Moulin Rouge." The Actors' Charitable Trust in London has an A4 coloured poster (by Clérice Frères) for the Moulin Rouge production of Claudine which does mention Colette: "Opérette en 3 Actes de Willy, d'après les Romans de Willy & Colette Willy."
