= Simon Bussy =

French painter

Albert Simon Aimé Bussy (30 June 1870 – 22 May 1954) was a French painter who married the English novelist Dorothy Bussy, née Strachey. He knew and painted many members of the Bloomsbury circle.

== Biography ==
Bussy was born in Dole and came from a family of shoemakers. He went from the drawing school in Dole to Gustave Moreau's studio in the École des beaux-arts de Paris, where he met and became friends with Henri Matisse. He received an honorable mention in 1894 at the Salon des artistes français for his Le Joueur de clarinette and Saint Georges terrassant le dragon. He showed a Portrait of Albert Machado in 1896. In 1897 he had his first solo exhibition at the Durand-Ruel gallery in Paris.

In 1901 Bussy visited London, where he came into contact with members of some English artistic circles, especially the Bloomsbury Group, and where he met Dorothy Strachey, who became his wife in 1903. Shortly after the wedding Simon and Dorothy moved to Roquebrune Cap Martin, in the south of France, where they bought a small house that soon became a meeting point for both French and English artists, writers and intellectuals. In addition to Dorothy's brother, the historian Lytton Strachey, and his cousin, the painter Duncan Grant, others included Rudyard Kipling, André Gide, Roger Fry, Vanessa Bell, Mark Gertler, Paul Valéry, Virginia Woolf, and Bernard Berenson. The painters Henri Matisse and Georges Rouault also visited.

Later, the Bussy spouses alternated between Roquebrune and England, where they spent the summer. At that time Simon painted mostly portraits (among others, Gide, Valéry and several of the Bloomsbury group), and pastel landscapes with pastel. Later he devoted himself almost exclusively to animals, especially birds, reptiles and fish, and would observe and study them at London Zoo.

Bussy was successful in the 1920s and 1930s, but his appreciation by both the public and critics declined after this time. He died in London in 1954, at the age of 88.

The contents of his study were sold at auction in 1960 by the auction house Sotheby's, and ended up dispersed among various buyers. Some pastels are now kept in the collections of National Portrait Gallery and the Tate Gallery in London. His works are also found in French museums including the Musée Nationale d'art Moderne in Paris and the regional Museum of Oise.

== Works in public collections ==
- Beauvais, MUDO - Musée de l'Oise : Portrait de Raoul Martin or Portrait d'Enfant au chapeau de paille.
- Paris :
  - Musée d'Orsay : La Rade de Villefranche.
  - Musée national d'art moderne : Butor du Venezuela, Drongos de l'Inde.
- Roquebrune-Cap-Martin : Monument aux morts, a mosaic depicting Zoum Walter.
- Roubaix, La Piscine : Pie bleue de l'Himalaya, Léona.
- Uzès, musée Georges-Borias :
  - Portrait d'André Gide;
  - Portrait de Paul Valéry.
- London, Tate Gallery:
  - Lady Ottoline Morrell;
  - Lady Strachey;
  - Landscape.
- London, National Portrait Gallery:
  - George Leigh Mallory.

== Sources ==
- Philippe Loisel, Simon Bussy, l'esprit du trait: du zoo à la gentry, Éditions Somogy, 1996.
- François Fosca, Simon Bussy, NRF Collection Peintres nouveaux, 1930.
- Catalogues from 1894 (p 29) and 1896 (p32) of the Salon de la Société des Artistes Français annual exhibition.
