= Oliver Strachey =

British civil servant and cryptographer (1874–1960)

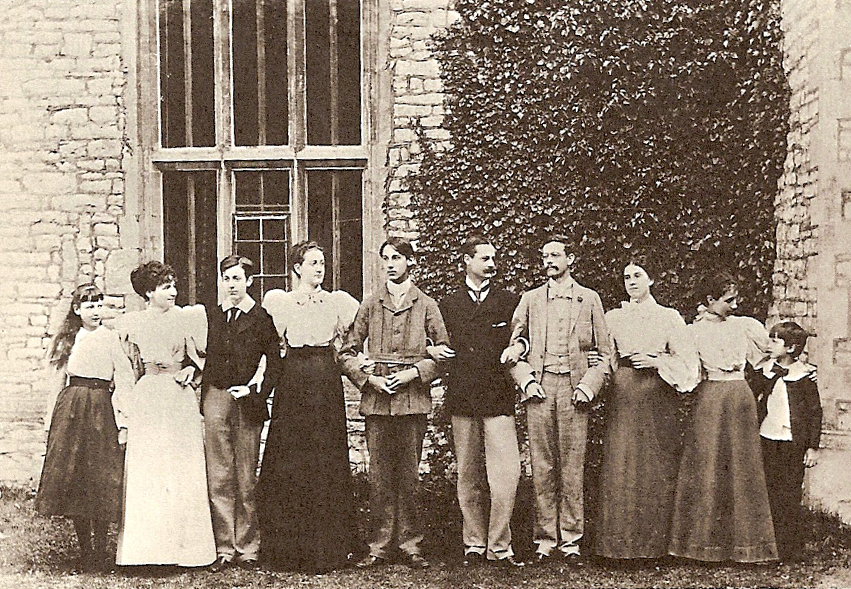
The sons and daughters of Sir Richard Strachey and Lady Strachey. Oliver is the fifth from the left.

Oliver Strachey CBE (3 November 1874 – 14 May 1960) was a British civil servant in the Foreign Office and cryptographer during World War I and World War II.

== Life and work ==
Strachey was a son of Sir Richard Strachey, colonial administrator and Jane Maria Strachey, writer and suffragist, and a brother of the writer Lytton Strachey, the writer Dorothy Bussy and the psychoanalyst and editor of the Standard Edition James Strachey. He was educated at Eton College; he attended Balliol College, Oxford for one term (Hilary 1893). His parents sent him on a tour around the world with Robert Bridges. Then he studied the piano in Vienna under Theodor Leschetizky. While there he attended the funeral of Johannes Brahms in 1897. His playing was of a certain standard, but not up to concert performance, so he returned to England and joined the Foreign Office.

His first marriage, in 1900, to Ruby Julia Mayer produced one daughter, Julia Strachey, and ended in divorce.

In 1911, he married Ray Costelloe (1887–1940). They had two children, Barbara Strachey (born 1912) and Christopher Strachey (born 1916). Christopher Strachey later became a pioneer in the development of computers and computer languages. Barbara Strachey became a writer.

While at the Foreign Office, he engaged in work on the East Indian Railway and historical research. He co-authored with his wife Ray a work on Keigwin's Rebellion (1683–84), an episode in the history of Bombay; it was published in 1916.

In World War I, he was in British Military (Army) Intelligence, MI1. Between the wars, he was in the Government Code and Cypher School. In 1934, Strachey and Hugh Foss broke the Japanese naval attaché machine cipher.

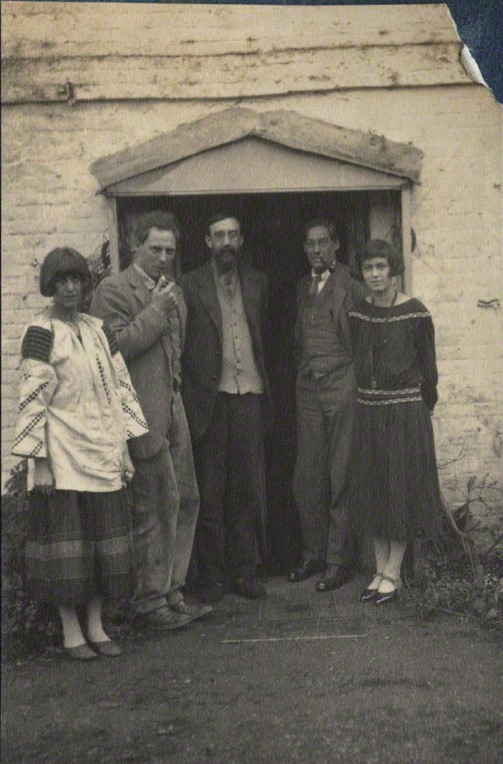
Dora Carrington, Ralph Partridge, Lytton and Oliver Strachey, and Frances Partridge; snapshot by Ottoline Morrell, 1923

In World War II, he was at Bletchley Park. He headed the ISOS section deciphering various messages on the Abwehr network involved with turned German agents (part of the Double Cross system), with the first decrypt issued on 14 April 1940. Initially codenamed Pear, the decrypts became known as ISOS, standing for Illicit Services (Oliver Strachey). He was replaced as head of ISOS by Denys Page in early 1942.

In December 1941, Strachey went to Ottawa, Canada, where he was chief cryptographer in the Examination Unit. This ambiguously named, top secret cypher department was the Canadian equivalent of Bletchley Park. His predecessor at the Unit was the notorious Herbert Osborne Yardley, who in 1931 had published a sensational exposé of American and British cryptography in World War I, The American Black Chamber. Yardley's contract was not renewed under pressure from Washington. Strachey refused to go to Ottawa until Yardley had left the city.

Strachey brought with him from England, keys to high-level French Vichy and Japanese diplomatic codes, which initiated close cooperation with Washington and London. Although he did not speak or read Japanese, he helped break the Japanese encryption, which was very complex, since it used variations of kanji, hiragana, and romanization. He returned to Bletchley Park in September 1942.

His recreations were music and reading. He was appointed a Commander of the Order of the British Empire (CBE) in 1943.
