= Olivia (1951 film) =

- French theatrical release poster
- Directed by: Jacqueline Audry
- Screenplay by: Pierre Laroche; Colette Audry (adaptation)
- Based on: Olivia by Dorothy Bussy
- Starring: Edwige Feuillère; Simone Simon; Marie-Claire Olivia
- Cinematography: Christian Matras
- Music by: Pierre Sancan
- Production company: Memnon Films
- Distributed by: Filmsonor (France); Arthur Davis Associates (USA)
- Release dates: 27 April 1951 (France); 8 April 1954 (U.S.)
- Running time: 95 minutes
- Country: France
- Language: French

Olivia (also known as The Pit of Loneliness) is a 1951 French film directed by Jacqueline Audry, and based on the 1950 semi-autobiographical novel of the same name by Dorothy Bussy. It has been called a "landmark of lesbian representation".

== Plot ==
In the late 19th century, Olivia, an English teenager, arrives at a finishing school in France. Olivia finds comfort in the school, which differs greatly from her former restrictive English boarding school, and where the students and faculty are welcoming.

The majority of the pupils in the school are divided into two camps: those that are devoted to the headmistress, Mlle Julie, and those who follow Mlle Cara, an emotionally manipulative invalid who is obsessed with Mlle Julie.

Olivia becomes an immediate favourite of Mademoiselle Cara, who shows her a photograph album full of pictures of the history of the school. When Olivia admires a girl in the pictures, Laura, Mlle Cara becomes angry and withdrawn; another pupil later explains that before she left, Laura was Mlle Julie's favourite pupil. Later, Olivia hears Mlle Julie reading Andromaque and begins to fall in love with her.

Mlle Julie takes Olivia to Paris on a day trip, and Olivia becomes more and more obsessed with her. Shortly after, Laura arrives and quickly becomes friends with Olivia. Olivia asks her if she is in love with Mlle Julie and Laura replies that she loves her, but is not in love with her. Later, Laura hears an argument where Mlle Cara accuses Mlle Julie of not loving her back, and being neglectful of her. Mlle Cara expresses her jealousy towards both Olivia and Laura, saying that both of them love Mlle Julie. That night, before going to bed, Mlle Julie passes Olivia's room, where she kisses her on the eyes while telling her to go to sleep. Olivia responds by passionately kissing her hands, which Mlle Julie tries to play it off as her being overly affectionate.

Around Christmas time, Laura leaves the school again, confessing to Olivia that she can't bear Mlle Cara's jealousy and warning Olivia to watch out. Directly after she leaves, however, Olivia goes to Mlle Julie and tells her she loves her.

At the Christmas ball, Mlle Julie kisses another pupil on the neck in front of Olivia, and later promises to join Olivia in her room later that night to give her bonbons. However, Mlle Julie does not come to visit her. Olivia is deeply disappointed and cries herself to sleep in front of the fire in Mlle Julie's room, where she is later discovered by Mlle Cara. Mlle Cara is enraged at finding her, and physically attacks her, telling her she's a disappointment. When Mlle Julie enters the room to see them fighting, Mlle Cara accuses her of going into the girls' rooms at night. After their fight, Mlle Julie announces that she will be leaving the school, leaving it in the care of Mlle Cara.

The night before she is to leave, Mlle Julie enters Olivia's room, confessing that she loves her. She leaves the room, only to return shortly after screaming for Olivia to call for help because Mlle Cara had died from an overdose of chloral. Mlle Julie is heartbroken over her death, calling Mlle Cara the only person she ever really loved. In the end, we see Olivia leaving the school on her carriage, indicating that maybe Mlle Julie kept her word about leaving the school, too.

== Cast ==
- Edwige Feuillère as Mlle. Julie
- Simone Simon as Mlle. Cara
- Marie-Claire Olivia as Olivia Dealey
- Yvonne de Bray as Victoire
- Suzanne Dehelly as Mlle. Dubois
- Marina de Berg as Mimi
- Lesly Meynard as Frau Riesener
- Danièle Delorme as Une ancienne élève
- Rina Rhéty as Signorina
- Tania Soucault as Georgie
- Elly Norden as Laura
- Nadine Olivier as Cécile

== Reception ==
For her part as Mlle. Julie, Edwige Feuillère was nominated for a BAFTA award for Best Foreign Actress in 1952.
