= Barbara Strachey =

British author (1912–1999)

Barbara Halpern Strachey (17 July 1912 – 15 October 1999 in Oxford, England) was a British author.

Barbara Strachey was born to parents Oliver Strachey, a cryptographer in World War I and World War II, and the feminist politician, writer, and amateur painter Ray Strachey. She attended schools in Switzerland, Vienna, and Oxford High School. She studied history at Lady Margaret Hall, Oxford University. Later she worked for the BBC for a period, and was involved in the transformation of the General Overseas Service into the World Service in 1965.

In 1934, Barbara Strachey married Olaf Hultin, the son of Professor Arvid Hultin of Helsinki, but they divorced in 1937. They had one son, Roger. She married for a second time in 1937, to Wolf Halpern, the son of Dr George Halpern of Jerusalem, who was killed in WWII. After the death of her brother, the computer scientist Christopher Strachey, she moved to a small house in Jericho, Oxford in 1975. She took up writing and was interested in the works of J. R. R. Tolkien.

Strachey was interviewed, twice in January 1977 and once in August 1979, by the historian, Brian Harrison, as part of the Suffrage Interviews project, titled Oral evidence on the suffragette and suffragist movements: the Brian Harrison interviews. She talks primarily about her mother, Ray Strachey, but also about her own interest in the Women's Employment Federation and her memories of family life when growing up.

== Books ==
Strachey published a number of books:

- Remarkable Relations (1980)
- Journeys of Frodo (1981)
- Mary Berenson – A Self-Portrait from Her Diaries and Letters (1984, with Jayne Samuels)
- The Strachey Line (1985)
- L'atlas du Seigneur des Anneaux (with Jérôme Lereculey)
- The Cause: A Short History of the Women's Movement in Great Britain (with Ray Strachey)
