= Pernel Strachey =

English academic

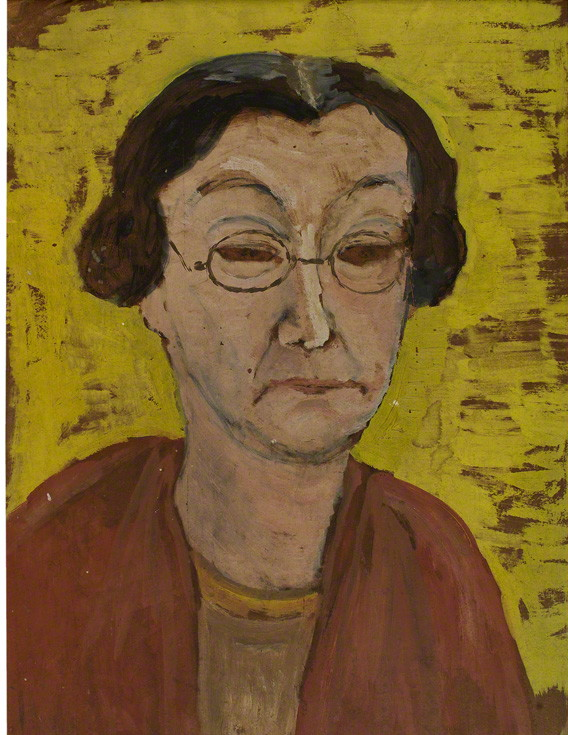
- Portrait by Ray Strachey; painted c. 1930
- Born: 4 March 1876; Clapham Common, Clapham, London, England
- Died: 19 December 1951 (aged 75); Gordon Square, Bloomsbury, London, England
- Known for: Principal of Newnham College
- Parent(s): Sir Richard Strachey; Jane Grant

Pernel Strachey or Joan Pernel Strachey (4 March 1876 – 19 December 1951) was an English scholar of French and Principal of Newnham College.

== Life ==
Strachey was born in Clapham Common in London in 1876. She came from a large family led by Lieutenant General Sir Richard Strachey and the suffragist Jane Maria Strachey. Her mother was a friend of Millicent Garrett Fawcett who had co-founded Newnham College in Cambridge. Her brothers included Lytton Strachey and Oliver Strachey, husband of Ray Costelloe.

The Strachey family background emphasised the life of the mind: "As a member of the large and distinguished Strachey family..., she shared its characteristically lively intellectual interests, wit and argumentative engagement with ideas. In manner she appeared shy and withdrawn ... but this veiled both kindness and a humorous regard for life's problems."

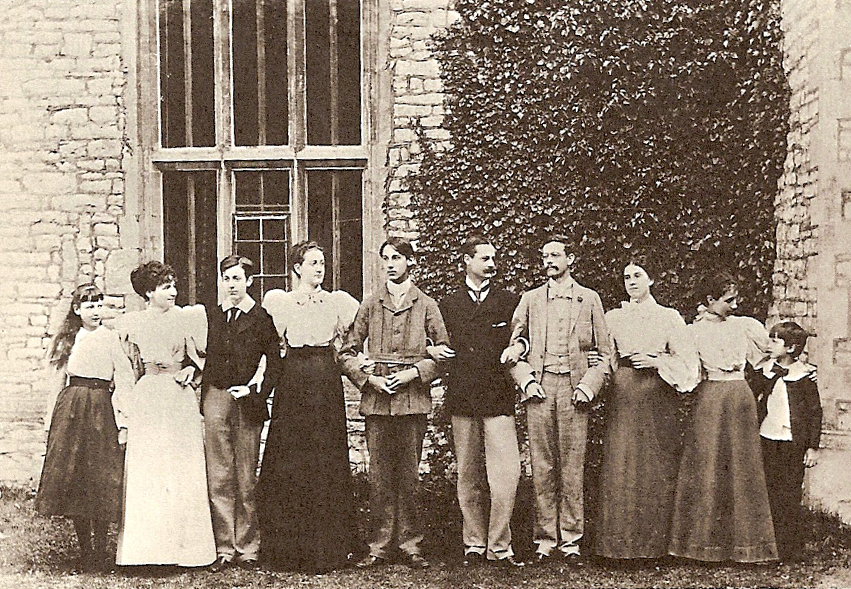
The sons and daughters of Sir Richard Strachey and Lady Strachey. Pernel is fourth from the left

Strachey went to Allenswood School. In 1895, she went to Newnham College, one of the two new women's colleges at the University of Cambridge. After first studying history, she transferred to Modern and Medieval Languages, as a scholar of early French. She studied at Paris, and by 1900 she was lecturing at Royal Holloway College in London. Strachey returned to Newnham College in 1905 as lecturer in French and Romance languages, becoming Director of Studies in modern and medieval languages in 1917. From 1909 she was heavily involved in administrative work for the college. The existence of women's educational establishments at Cambridge was still controversial, and women could not yet receive Cambridge degrees. Strachey played a leading role in the campaign for degrees for women, but it would not succeed during her time at Cambridge.

She became Principal of Newnham College in 1927, a post she retained until her retirement in 1941. "As Principal, Pernel Strachey showed an acute ability, deceptively hidden, for management, fund-raising and an awareness of every aspect of college life. Surprisingly for one from a Bloomsbury background she maintained strict ideas about student behaviour and was described by many as too conservative. ... At Council meetings she seems always to have maintained an amused but restraining hand." Her biographer describes her as "a witty and fluent speaker and debater. She possessed the easy but polished politeness of an earlier and more formal era which reflected the upper class moeurs of her family – and which was much missed by many when she left."

She used her friendship with the Bloomsbury Group and Virginia Woolf to get Woolf to deliver a talk in 1928. Woolf stayed at Newnham and her talk to the Newnham Arts Society was the basis for her essay A Room of One's Own.

After retirement in 1941, Strachey hoped to find time for research in her field of Anglo-Norman literature, but increasing ill health, and the pressure of wartime, did not allow this. Strachey died at the family's Bloomsbury home (since 1919), no. 51 Gordon Square in London, on 19 December 1951, aged 75.

Academic offices
Preceded by Blanche Athena Clough	Principal of Newnham College, Cambridge; 1927–1941	Succeeded by Dame Myra Curtis
