= The Standard Edition of the Complete Psychological Works of Sigmund Freud =

Complete edition of the works of Sigmund Freud, the founder of psychoanalysis

The Standard Edition of the Complete Psychological Works of Sigmund Freud is a complete edition of the works of Sigmund Freud, the founder of psychoanalysis. It was translated from the German under the general editorship of James Strachey, in collaboration with Anna Freud, assisted by Alix Strachey and Alan Tyson. The Standard Edition (usually abbreviated as SE) consists of 24 volumes, and it was originally published by the Hogarth Press in London in 1953–1974. Unlike the German Gesammelte Werke, the SE contains critical footnotes by the editors. This editorial material has later been included in the German-language Studienausgabe edition of Freud.

In 2024 a new and revised edition of the SE known as the RSE, was published by Bloomsbury Publishing under the editorship of Mark Solms.

== Contents ==
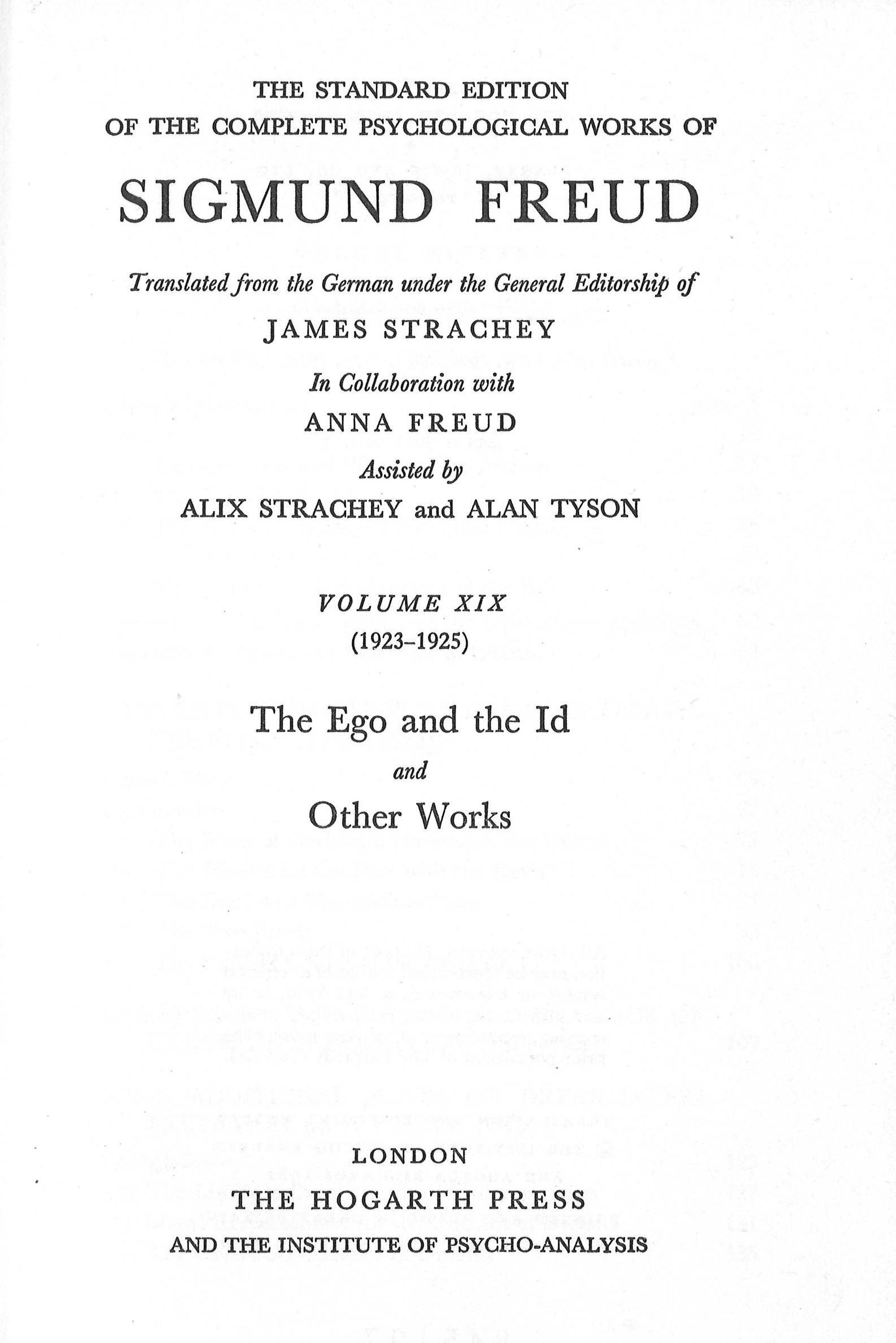
Title page from vol. XIX.

- Vol. I Pre-Psycho-Analytic Publications and Unpublished Drafts (1886–1899)
- Vol. II Studies on Hysteria (1893–1895) (by Josef Breuer and Sigmund Freud)
- Vol. III Early Psycho-Analytic Publications (1893–1899)
- Vol. IV The Interpretation of Dreams (I) (1900)
- Vol. V The Interpretation of Dreams (II) and On Dreams (1900–1901)
- Vol. VI The Psychopathology of Everyday Life (1901)
- Vol. VII A Case of Hysteria, Three Essays on Sexuality and Other Works (1901–1905)
- Vol. VIII Jokes and their Relation to the Unconscious (1905)
- Vol. IX Jensen's 'Gradiva' and Other Works (1906–1909)
- Vol. X The Cases of 'Little Hans' and the 'Rat Man' (1909)
- Vol. XI Five Lectures on Psycho-Analysis, Leonardo and Other Works (1910)
- Vol. XII Case History of Schreber, Papers on Technique and Other Works (1911–1913)
- Vol. XIII Totem and Taboo and Other Works (1913–1914)
- Vol. XIV A History of the Psycho-Analytic Movement, Papers on Metapsychology and Other Works (1914–1916)
- Vol. XV Introductory Lectures on Psycho-Analysis (Parts I and II) (1915–1916)
- Vol. XVI Introductory Lectures on Psycho-Analysis (Part III) (1916–1917)
- Vol. XVII An Infantile Neurosis and Other Works (1917–1919)
- Vol. XVIII Beyond the Pleasure Principle, Group Psychology and Other Works (1920–1922)
- Vol. XIX The Ego and the Id and Other Works (1923–1925)
- Vol. XX An Autobiographical Study, Inhibitions, Symptoms and Anxiety, Lay Analysis and Other Works (1925–1926)
- Vol. XXI The Future of an Illusion, Civilization and its Discontents and Other Works (1927–1931)
- Vol. XXII New Introductory Lectures on Psycho-Analysis and Other Works (1932–1936)
- Vol. XXIII Moses and Monotheism, An Outline of Psycho-Analysis and Other Works (1937–1939)
- Vol. XXIV Indexes, Bibliography, etc. (Compiled by Angela Richards, 1974)

== The Revised Standard Edition of the Complete Psychological Works of Sigmund Freud ==
A revised and newly annotated edition of the Standard Edition texts was published in 2024 under the editorship of Mark Solms.

== Bibliography ==
- The Standard Edition of the Complete Psychological Works of Sigmund Freud. Translated from the German under the General Editorship of James Strachey. In collaboration with Anna Freud. Assisted by Alix Strachey and Alan Tyson, 24 volumes. Vintage, 1999. [Reprint.] ISBN 0-09-929622-5
- The Revised Standard Edition of the Complete Psychological Works of Sigmund Freud, I–XIV Translated from the German under the general editorship of James Strachey, in collaboration with Anna Freud, assisted by Alix Strachey and Alan Tyson. Editor of the revised edition, Mark Solms in collaboration with Ilse Grubrich-Simitis. Lanham (Md.): Rowman & Littlefield, 2024. ISBN 978-1-5381-7516-3
