= Dorothy Bussy =

English novelist and translator

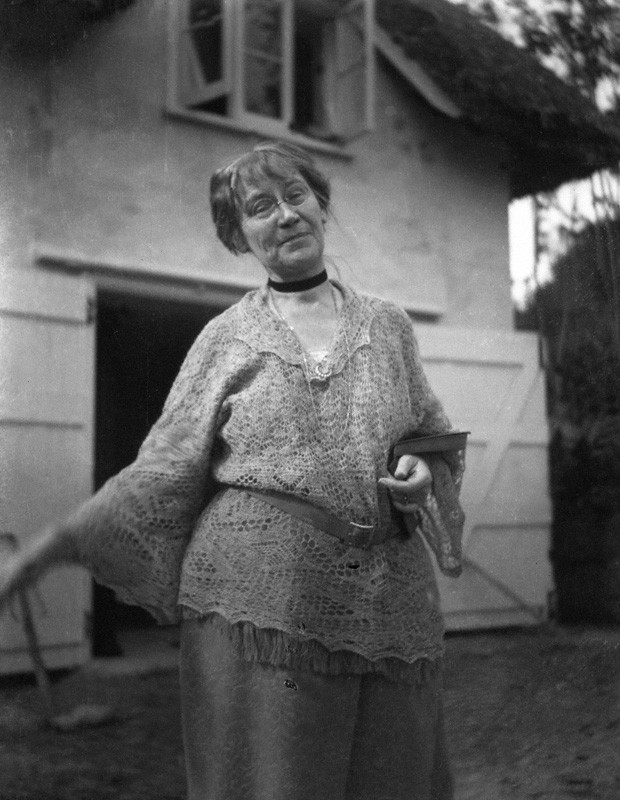
- Dorothy Bussy (née Strachey), ca. 1923
- Born: Dorothy Strachey; June 24, 1865
- Died: May 1, 1960 (aged 94)
- Occupations: Novelist; translator

Dorothy Bussy (née Strachey; 24 July 1865 – 1 May 1960) was an English novelist and translator, close to the Bloomsbury Group. She is best known for her 1949 coming-of-age novel Olivia, which she published under a pseudonym.

== Family background and childhood ==
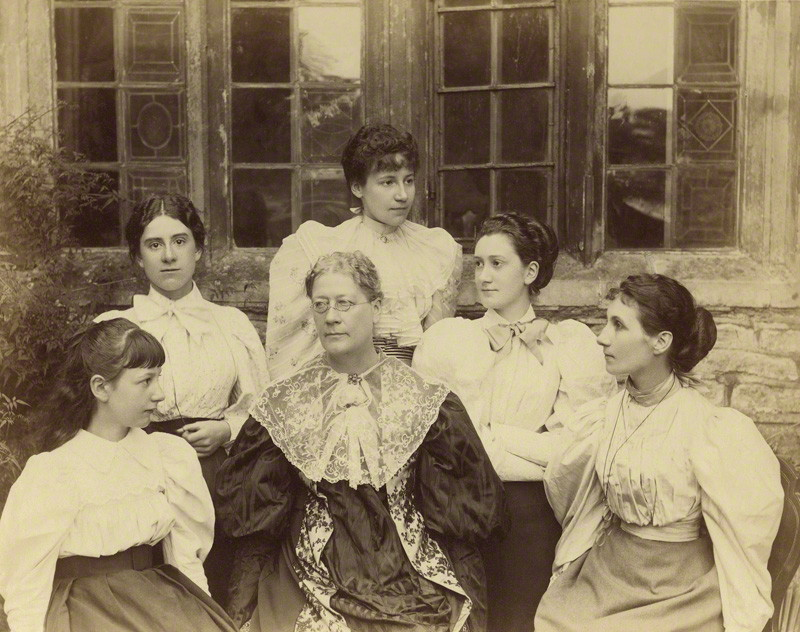
A photograph taken by Graystone Bird (albumen print/NPG x13111) of Jane Strachey and her daughters, ca. 1893 (Dorothy is 2nd from left)

Dorothy Bussy was a member of the Strachey family. Her mother was suffragist Jane Strachey and her father was British Empire soldier and administrator Richard Strachey. Bussy was one of thirteen children, three of which died in infancy. Her siblings include writer and critic Lytton Strachey, scholar Pernel Strachey, and activist Philippa Strachey. Bussy was educated at the Marie Souvestre girls' school at Les Ruches, Fontainebleau, France and later in England. She was later a teacher with Souvestre, and one of her pupils was Eleanor Roosevelt.

== Personal life ==
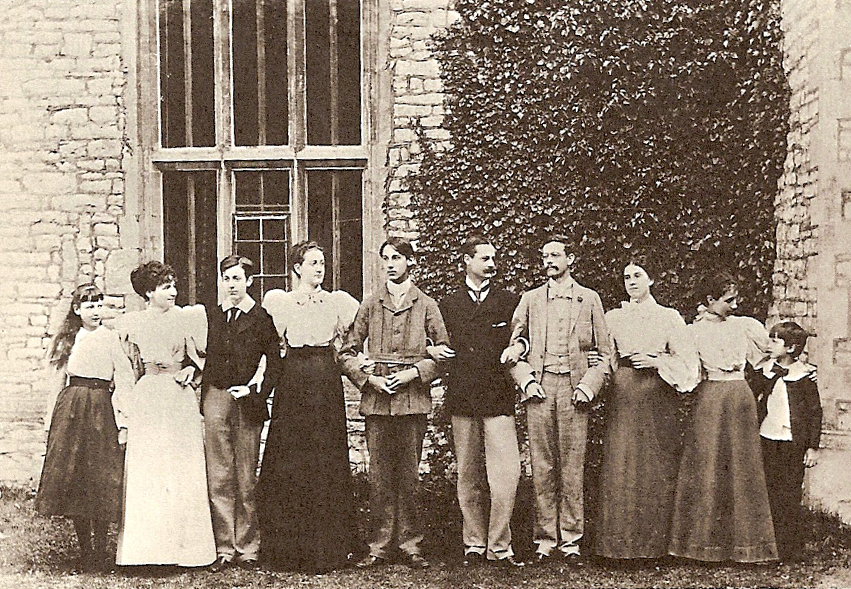
The sons and daughters of Sir Richard Strachey and Lady Macdonald. Dorothy is the second from the left.

In 1903, she married the French painter Simon Bussy (1870–1954), who knew Matisse, and was on the fringes of the Bloomsbury circle. He was five years younger, and the son of a shoemaker from the Jura town of Dole. Lady Strachey’s liberalism faltered at the sight of him actually cleaning up his plate with pieces of bread. The family drama "shook the regime of Lancaster Gate to its foundations" (Holroyd), and, despite the silent disapprobation of the older Stracheys, Dorothy remained determined to marry him with what her brother Lytton later called "extraordinary courage".

The couple's daughter, the artist Jane Simone Bussy, was born in 1906.

Dorothy was bisexual. She was involved in a affairs with both men and women, including Lady Ottoline Morrell. She became friends with Charles Mauron, the lover of E. M. Forster.

== Writing ==
In 1949, Bussy published the coming-of-age novel, Olivia, under the pseudonym "Olivia." It was printed by the Hogarth Press, the publishing house founded by Leonard and Virginia Woolf. The novel follows the "intellectual and sexual awakenings" of a 16 year-old student at a girls boarding school through her relationship with her teacher Mademoiselle Julie. The novel draws on Bussy's own experiences in the schools of Marie Souvestre. The novel's themes also follow that of the 1931 German film Mädchen in Uniform and Colette's novel Claudine at School (1900).

The novel is noted for its exploration of female sexuality and queer romance. In 1999, the novel was ranked at number 35 on Publishing Triangle's '100 best lesbian and gay novels' list.

Bussy's novel was translated into French and appeared with an introduction by writer Rosamond Lehmann. In 1951, Jacqueline Audry directed a film adaptation of the novel. A BBC radio dramatisation was broadcast in the 1990s.

Bussy was also a close friend of the French author André Gide, whom she had met by chance in the summer of 1918 when she was 52. Their long-distance friendship lasted for over 30 years. Their letters are published in Richard Tedeschi's Selected Letters of André Gide and Dorothy Bussy . The originals are preserved in the British Library. Bussy is also known for translating Gide's works into English.

== Legacy ==
Olivia Records was a collective founded in 1973 to record and market women's music, named after the heroine of the 1949 novel Olivia by Bussy (the heroine and the novel both being named Olivia.)
