= Olivia (Bussy novel) =

1949 novel by Dorothy Bussy

- First edition
- Author: Dorothy Bussy
- Cover artist: Duncan Grant
- Language: English
- Genre: Novel
- Set in: France
- Published: 1949 by Hogarth Press
- Publication place: United Kingdom
- Media type: Print
- Pages: 109 pp
- OCLC: 255217658

Olivia is a novel by Dorothy Bussy. It was published in 1949 by Hogarth Press, the publishing house founded by Leonard and Virginia Woolf. Bussy wrote it in French and signed her work with the pseudonym "Olivia." "Olivia" had been the name of one of Dorothy's sisters who died in infancy. The book was translated into English and then retranslated back into French. Bussy dedicated it "to the very dear memory of Virginia W." It was the only novel written by Bussy.

== Summary ==
Set in the late 19th century at a finishing school in France, the plot dramatizes the passion of a young English boarding student for one of her French teachers, Mlle Julie, whose character owes much to Marie Souvestre.

== Critical reception and scandal ==
Its success was immediate, in the United Kingdom as much as in foreign countries. It was hailed as a minor masterpiece. The French edition received little notice from French reviewers, despite its introduction by Rosamond Lehmann.

The novel caused a scandal when it first appeared, even though it belongs to an already well-established tradition, from Claudine à l'école by Colette (1900) to the film Girls in Uniform (Mädchen in Uniform) (1931), based on the play by Christa Winsloe. In their correspondence, Gide and Bussy did not fail to mention Mädchen in Uniform, the cinematic version of which had already been shown in Paris during the interwar period. In 1934 after this discussion Bussy sent the text, which she had been writing since the year before, to her close friend André Gide to ask his opinion. He replied it was "not very engaging," which hurt Bussy deeply. Because of Gide's discouraging response, Bussy gave up on publishing it for fifteen years. After the book's success, Gide apologized to Bussy for not having appreciated her work at first.

In 1999, her novel was ranked at number 35 on Publishing Triangle's '100 best lesbian and gay novels' list.

== French edition ==
The first French edition, published by Stock in 1949, benefited from a foreword by Rosamond Lehmann, who was also close to Leonard Woolf and the Bloomsbury Group.

== Adaptations ==
- 1951: Olivia, a French film directed by Jacqueline Audry, based on the British novel of that title, with Edwige Feuillère and Simone Simon in the leading roles.
