= Eminent Victorians =

1918 book by Lytton Strachey

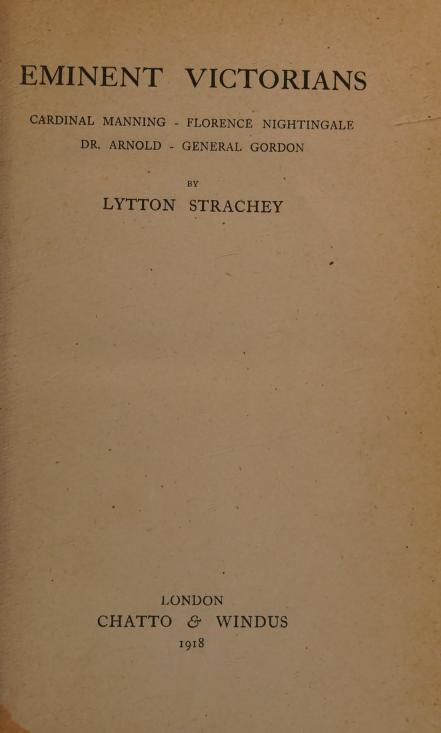
- Title page of the first page
- Author: Lytton Strachey
- Publication date: 1918

Eminent Victorians is a book by Lytton Strachey, first published in 1918, and consisting of biographies of four well known figures from the Victorian era. Its fame rests on the irreverence and wit Strachey brought to bear on three men and a woman who had until then been regarded as heroes: Cardinal Manning, Florence Nightingale, Thomas Arnold and General Charles Gordon. While Nightingale is actually praised and her reputation enhanced, the book shows its other subjects in a less-than-flattering light, for instance, the intrigues of Cardinal Manning against Cardinal Newman.

The book made Strachey's name and placed him firmly in the top rank of biographers.

== Background ==
Strachey developed the idea for Eminent Victorians in 1912, when he was living on occasional journalism and writing dilettante plays and verse for his Bloomsbury friends. He went to live in the country at East Ilsley and started work on a book then called Victorian Silhouettes, containing miniature biographies of a dozen notable Victorian personalities. In November 1912, he wrote to Virginia Woolf that their Victorian predecessors "seem to me a set of mouth bungled hypocrites". After his research into the life of Cardinal Manning, he realised he would have difficulty managing twelve lives. In the following year he moved to Wiltshire, where he stayed until 1915, by which time he had completed half the book. One of the subjects he considered but rejected was Isabella Beeton. He chose not to write about her because he could not find sufficient relevant material.

By then it was wartime, and Strachey's anti-war and anti-conscription activities were taking up his time. He hardened his views and concluded that the Victorian worthies had not just been hypocrites, but that they had bequeathed to his generation the "profoundly evil" system, "by which it is sought to settle international disputes by force".

By 1917, the work was ready for publication and Strachey was put in touch with Geoffrey Whitworth at Chatto & Windus. The critic Frank Arthur Swinnerton was taken with the work and it was published on 9 May 1918, with almost uniformly enthusiastic reviews.

== Summary ==
Each of the lives is very different from the others, although there are common threads, for example the recurrent appearance of William Ewart Gladstone and Arthur Hugh Clough. Each story is set against a specific background.

In Cardinal Manning's story, the background is the creation of the Oxford Movement and the defection of an influential group of Church of England clergy to the Catholic Church. That is covered in depth to explain the Movement and its main protagonists, particularly Manning's hostile relationship with John Henry Newman. Strachey is critical of Manning's underhanded manipulations in attempting to prevent Newman being made a Cardinal.

The background features of Florence Nightingale's story are the machinations of the War Office, and the obtuseness of the military and politicians. Influenced by Sigmund Freud, Strachey depicts Florence Nightingale as an intense, driven woman who is both personally intolerable and admirable in her achievements.

Dr. Arnold is hailed as an exemplar who established the Public School system. Strachey describes that as an education based on chapel and the classics, with a prefectorial system to maintain order. He points out that it was not Arnold who was responsible for the obsession with sport, but does make it clear that Arnold was at fault in ignoring the sciences. Although Arnold was revered at the time, Strachey sees his approach as very damaging in retrospect. Strachey also mocks Arnold's efforts at moral improvement of the general public, for example his unsuccessful weekly newspaper.

The story of Gordon is that of a maverick soldier and adventurer, whose original military achievements in China would have been forgotten. He was a mercenary who got into and out of conflicts on behalf of various dubious governments, but much of his experience was in the Sudan. The final disaster was when the Egyptian occupation of Sudan was almost completely overthrown by fundamentalist rebels, and someone was needed to retrieve the situation in Khartoum. The job fell to Gordon, whose instincts were to do anything but withdraw, and he became embroiled in a siege. The British government was put in an almost impossible dilemma, and when eventually they did send a relief expedition it arrived just two days too late. Strachey based Gordon’s story on his diaries and letters to give an account of a strong individual almost at odds with the world.

== Critical reception ==
On 21 May 1918, Bertrand Russell wrote to Gladys Rinder from Brixton Prison, in which he was imprisoned for his anti-war campaigning:

It is brilliant, delicious, exquisitely civilized. I enjoyed as much as any the Gordon, which alone was quite new to me. I often laughed out loud in my cell while I was reading the book. The warder came to my cell to remind me that prison was a place of punishment.

The American critic Edmund Wilson wrote in the New Republic of 21 September 1932, not long after Strachey's death: "Lytton Strachey's chief mission, of course, was to take down once and for all the pretensions of the Victorian age to moral superiority ... neither the Americans nor the English have ever, since Eminent Victorians appeared, been able to feel quite the same about the legends that had dominated their pasts. Something had been punctured for good."

== Significance ==
With the publication of Eminent Victorians, Lytton Strachey set out to breathe life into the Victorian era for future generations to read. Up until that point, as Strachey remarked in the preface, Victorian biographies had been "as familiar as the cortège of the undertaker, and wear the same air of slow, funereal barbarism." Strachey defied the tradition of "two fat volumes ... of undigested masses of material", and took aim at the four venerated figures.

British Labour politician Roy Hattersley wrote: "Lytton Strachey's elegant, energetic character assassinations destroyed for ever the pretensions of the Victorian age to moral supremacy.".
