= Jane Maria Strachey =

English suffragist and writer (1840–1928)

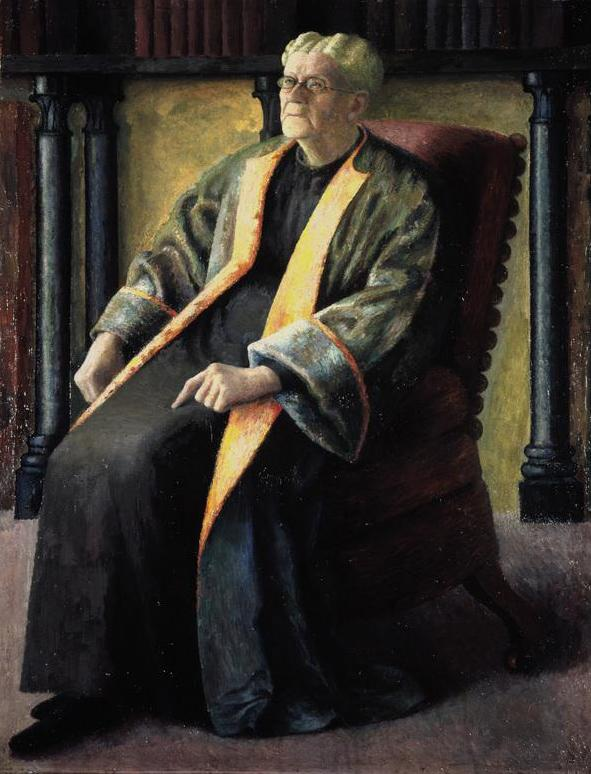
- 1902 portrait by Dora Carrington
- Born: Jane Maria Grant; 13 March 1840; Sea off the Cape of Good Hope
- Died: 14 December 1928 (aged 88)
- Spouse: Sir Richard Strachey (1859–1908; his death)
- Children: 13, including Lytton, James, Dorothea, Pernel, and Oliver
- Father: Sir John Peter Grant

Jane Maria Strachey, Lady Strachey (née Grant; 13 March 1840 – 14 December 1928) was an English suffragist and writer. Her father was a British colonial administrator; Jane married her father's secretary, Sir Richard Strachey, and ten of their children survived into adulthood. She was an outspoken advocate for the right of women to vote, and involved her daughters in her campaigning. She wrote two books for children.

== Early life ==
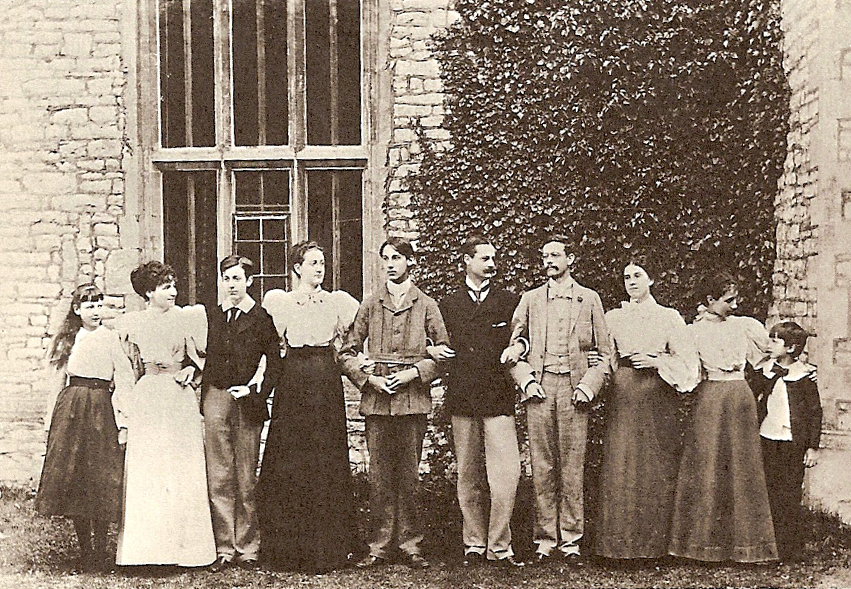
The children of Sir Richard and Lady Strachey

Lady Strachey was born on the ship Earl of Hardwicke off the coast of Cape of Good Hope on 13 March 1840. Her father was British Colonial Administrator Sir John Peter Grant, who later served as the Lieutenant-Governor of Bengal and as Governor of Jamaica, and her mother was Henrietta Chichele Plowden. Strachey became the second wife of her father's secretary, Sir Richard Strachey, who was 23 years older than her, in 1859. Sir Richard and Lady Strachey had 13 children, 10 of whom survived into adulthood – Lytton, James, Dorothea, Pernel, Oliver, Marjorie, Dick, Ralph, Philippa and Elinor.

== Professional life ==
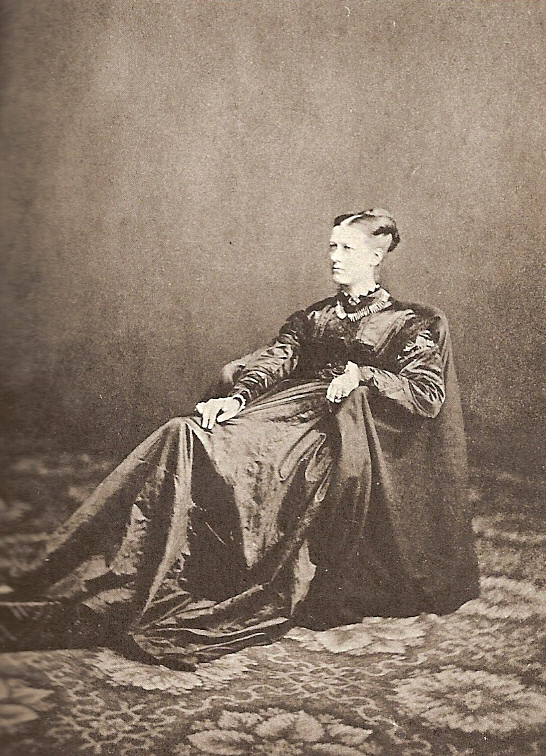
Lady Strachey in her younger days

Her husband introduced her to the works of John Stuart Mill. They moved to Edinburgh in 1866–1867 and Lady Strachey began gathering signatures for petitioning the Parliament for women's right to vote. Her first article on women's suffrage was published in The Attempt, which was published by the Edinburgh Ladies Debating Society. She became a member of the Edinburgh National Society for Women's Suffrage in 1868 but moved to India with her husband who was posted in the British Colonial administration again.

The couple returned to London in 1879 and she restarted her suffrage work. She was an active supporter of the New Hospital for Women, an initiative to provide poor women with medical help from qualified female practitioners. She was also a financial supporter of Girton College, Cambridge. She was an organiser of the Women's Local Government Society and in 1909 became the chair of its London branch. Her work achieved fruition when a WLGS-sponsored parliamentary Bill was mentioned in the King's Speech in 1907.

Lady Strachey also published two children's books, in 1887 and 1893. She also wrote Poets on Poets in 1894, besides working on an English translation of Alexander Herzen's De l'autre rive. An account of her and her family is provided in Betty Askwith's Two Victorian Families.

In 1907, Lady Strachey was elected to the executive committee of the National Union of Women's Suffrage Societies. She and her daughters were also active organisers of the Mud March from Hyde Park to Exeter Hall to demand the right to vote. In 1909 she became an editorial board member of the English Woman's Journal and was elected as the President of the South Paddington Committee of the London Society for Women's Suffrage. Her professional activities declined after her husband's death in 1909. She was offered the directorship of the Society of Women Writers and Journalists in 1920, which she declined. She died in 1928. Virginia Woolf wrote an extensive obituary essay detailing Lady Strachey's contribution to the women's movement.
