= Alix Strachey =

American-British psychoanalyst (1892–1973)

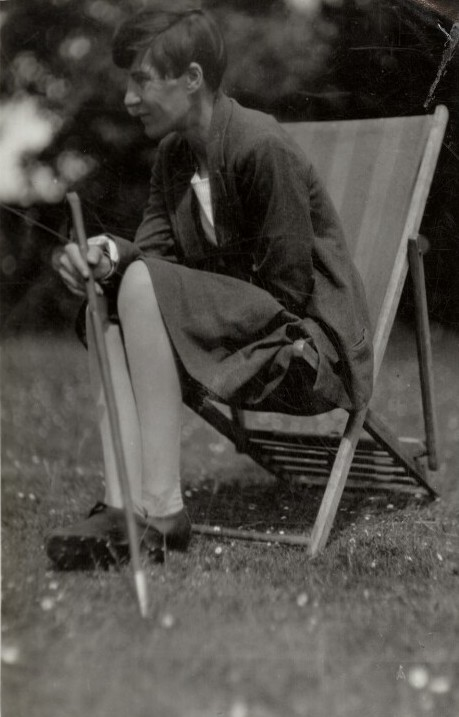
- Alix Strachey
- Born: Alix Sargant-Florence; 4 June 1892; Nutley, New Jersey, US
- Died: 28 April 1973 (aged 80); Great Marlow, England
- Education: Bedales School, Slade School of Fine Art, Newnham College, Cambridge
- Spouse(s): James Strachey (m. 1920; his death 1967)

Alix Strachey (née Sargant-Florence; 4 June 1892 – 28 April 1973) was an American-born British psychoanalyst and, with her husband, the translator into English of The Standard Edition of the Complete Psychological Works of Sigmund Freud.

== Life ==
Strachey was born in Nutley, New Jersey, United States on 4 June 1892. She was the daughter of Henry Smyth Florence, an American musician, and Mary Sargant Florence, a British painter. Her brother, Philip Sargant Florence, became an economist and married the birth control activist Lella Faye Secor.

Alix's father died in an accident when she was a baby. She attended Bedales School, the Slade School of Fine Art, and Newnham College, Cambridge, where she read modern languages. In 1915 she moved in with her brother in his flat in Bloomsbury and became a member of the Bloomsbury Group, where she met James Strachey, the assistant editor of The Spectator. They moved in together in 1919 and married the following year on 4 June 1920 at St Pancras. In the same year they went to Vienna, where James, an admirer of Freud, began a psychoanalysis with him. Soon afterwards Alix also underwent psychoanalysis. Alix and James's journey to Vienna in 1920 is seen as a key event in the development of psychoanalysis.

Freud asked the couple to translate some of his works into English, and this was to become their lives' work. Alix and her husband worked with Sigmund Freud and helped him translate the readings in to english. Her translations became apart of Freuds work. Both became psychoanalysts themselves, and as well as Freud's works also translated works by a number of other European psychoanalysts including Karl Abraham, Melanie Klein and Otto Fenichel. Their translations remain the standard editions of Freud's works to this day.

She lived at Marlow, Buckinghamshire, in the house "Lord's Wood" built for her mother (1899–1900).

== Selected works ==
- A New German-English Psychoanalytical Vocabulary, Published for the Institute of Psycho-analysis by Ballière. Tindall and Cox, 1943, 84 p. ASIN B0007FQ5FM.
- The Unconscious Motives of War, New York, Universities Press, 1956 / Allen & Urwin, 1957, 283 p. ASIN B0000CJNF4.
- The Psychology of Nationhood (1960)

=== Translations ===
- Selected Papers of Karl Abraham [on Psycho-analysis]
- Sigmund Freud, Inhibitions, Symptoms and Anxiety, 1936.
- Melanie Klein, The Psycho-Analysis of Children, Delacorte Press/Seymour Lawrence, rééd.1975, ISBN 978-0440060857
- (Collaboration) The Standard Edition of the Complete Psychological Works of Sigmund Freud
