= James Strachey =

British psychoanalyst (1887–1967)

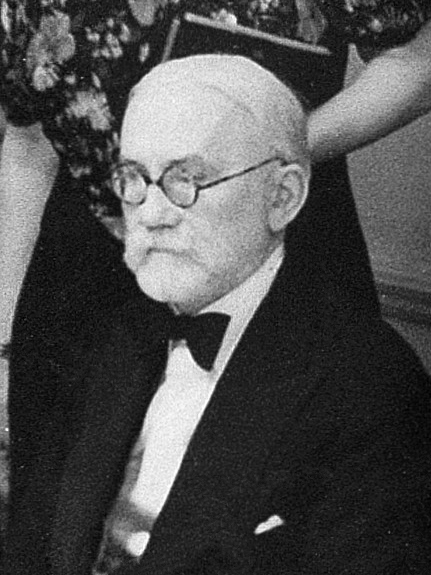
James Strachey in 1952

James Beaumont Strachey (/ˈstreɪtʃi/; 26 September 1887, London – 25 April 1967, High Wycombe) of the Strachey family was a British psychoanalyst, and, with his wife Alix, translator of Sigmund Freud into English. He is perhaps best known as the general editor of The Standard Edition of the Complete Psychological Works of Sigmund Freud, "the international authority" of Freud's works.

== Early life ==
James Strachey was the a son of Lt-Gen Sir Richard Strachey and Lady Jane Maria Strachey—a marriage which, being on the one hand an imperial marriage, and on the other, a loving one, has been noted as an example par excellence of Victorian middle-class marriage. Indeed, in a family size characteristic of the ideals of the period, James was the youngest of ten children. Since his father was 70 and his mother 47 when he was born, he was called the enfant miracle, Jembeau, or Uncle Baby by nieces and nephews, who were considerably older than James.

He was educated at Hillbrow preparatory school in Rugby and, beginning in fall 1905, at Trinity College, Cambridge, where he took over the rooms used by his older brother Lytton Strachey, and was known as "the Little Strachey"; Lytton was now "the Great Strachey". During his time at Cambridge, he became associated with the Bloomsbury Group or "Bloomsberries."

It was through this social scene that Strachey met all of his love interests. As a young undergraduate, Strachey fell deeply in love with the poet Rupert Brooke, who answered his correspondence but did not return his affections. He was himself pursued by mountaineer George Mallory, by Harry Norton and by economist John Maynard Keynes, with whom he also had an affair. However, by 1910—upon meeting his future love interests, Alix Strachey and Noël Olivier—Strachey's love life was primarily heterosexual in character. Nonetheless, Strachey and Rupert remained very close until the latter's death in 1915, which left Strachey shattered.

After leaving Cambridge in 1909, Strachey became an assistant editor of The Spectator, working under his cousin, John St Loe Strachey. He resigned in 1915 when The Spectator asked Strachey, in accordance with the Derby Scheme, to publicly announce his support for World War I. Upon the imposition of military conscription in 1916, Strachey became a conscientious objector. After the war, Strachey was employed as a drama critic for Athanaeum, which was eventually absorbed by The Nation in 1921 (and itself later absorbed by the New Statesman in 1931). By 1923, The Nation was owned by Maynard Keynes and edited by Leonard Woolf. It was here that Strachey became closer to Leonard, which would prove to be a decisive factor in Woolf's Hogarth Press eventually being the premier publisher of Freud's works.

Although Strachey and Alix first met in 1910, their relationship did not develop romantically until 1917, in large part due to Alix's pursual of James. They eventually moved in together in 1919 and married in 1920. Soon afterwards they moved to Vienna, where Strachey began a psychoanalysis with Freud, of whom he was a great admirer. He would claim to Lytton that his analysis "provided 'a complete undercurrent for life'". Freud asked the couple to translate some of his works into English, and this became their lives' work: they became “my excellent English translators, Mr and Mrs James Strachey”.

== Turn to psychoanalysis ==
Looking back forty years later at this turning-point, Strachey commented in a "disarming passage" to his fellow analysts on his then qualifications as a psychoanalytic candidate, as compared to modern times: "A discreditable academic career with the barest of B.A. degrees, no medical qualifications...no experience of anything except third-rate journalism. The only thing in my favour was that at the age of thirty I wrote a letter out of the blue to Freud, asking him if he would take me on as a student."

He continued by saying that, having spent a couple of years in Vienna, “I got back to London in the summer of 1922, and in October, without any further ado, I was elected an associate member of the British Psychoanalytical Society. ... A year later, I was made a full member. So there I was, launched on the treatment of patients, with no experience, with no supervision, with nothing to help me but some two years of analysis with Freud."

He concluded wryly that the modern "curriculum vitae is essential. Whether it is possible for it to become over-institutionalized is an open question. Is it worthwhile to leave a loophole for an occasional maverick? ... if the curriculum vitae had existed forty years ago, you wouldn't have had to listen to these remarks tonight."

Nevertheless, Freud had decided that "the Stracheys should become members (full) of the Society. ... To be sure their conflicts have not been decided, but we need not wait so long, we can only instigate the processus which has to be fed by the factors of life." James and Alix thus both become practising analysts; James subsequently began publishing his own original articles; and the two of them (in collaboration with Jones and Joan Riviere) began translating Freud's works in earnest, as well as writings by a number of other European psychoanalysts such as Karl Abraham. Their translation of Freud's works, in twenty-four volumes, remains the standard edition of Freud's works to this day, and according to Michael Holroyd a German publishing house considered retranslating their translation of the Master's works back into German, because they were a work of art and scholarship, with a maze of additional footnotes and introductions.

While the Stracheys were instrumental in encouraging Melanie Klein to come to England to pursue her analytic discoveries, both remained loyal to Freud at the same time, and stood as part of the Middle Group in the wartime Controversial discussions between the proponents of Melanie Klein and of Anna Freud. James Strachey characterised the battle between the two women in his own wryly sensible way: "My own view is that Mrs K. has made some highly important contributions ... but that it’s absurd to make out (a) that they cover the whole subject or (b) that their validity is axiomatic. On the other hand, I think it is equally ludicrous for Miss F. to maintain that [Psychoanalysis] is a Game Preserve belonging to the F. family".

== Psychoanalytic writings ==
Strachey published three articles in the International Journal of Psychoanalysis between 1930 and 1935. In the first, on "Some Unconscious Factors in Reading"[1930], he explored the 'oral ambitions...[in] "taking in" words, by hearing or reading, both unconsciously meaning "eating"' – something of central significance 'for reading addictions as well as for neurotic disturbances of reading'.

In his 1931 article on the "Precipitating Factor in the Etiology of the Neuroses", Strachey examined those 'experiences that disturb the equilibrium between warded-of impulses and warding-off forces, an equilibrium hitherto relatively stable'.

His most important contribution, however, was that of 1934 on "The Nature of the Therapeutic Action of Psychoanalysis" – a seminal article arguing that "the fact that the pathogenic conflicts, revived in the transference, are now experienced in their full emotional content makes the transference interpretation so much more effective than any other interpretation". Half a century later, the role of "mutative transference interpretations as described by Strachey (1934)" was still serving as a starting-point for discussion.

His 1962 "Sketch" of Freud's life and work, which serves as an introduction to the Penguin Freud Library, was grounded in his intimate knowledge of the Freudian corpus.

== Translations ==
In one of his last letters to Freud, Ernest Jones wrote that "You probably know you have the reputation of not being the easiest author to translate." Certainly when translation into English began, "the earliest versions were not always felicitous ... casual and at times fearfully inaccurate". With the coming of the Stracheys, however, "translations began to improve: in 1924 and 1925, a small English team brought out Freud's Collected Papers, in four volumes" which have been described as "the most vigorous translations into English" of all time.

The most "obvious flaw in this translation was the substitution of esoteric neologisms for the plain German terms Freud preferred", so that for example his I and his It become the 'Ego' and the 'Id'. Lacan took particular exception to "the translation of instinct for Trieb [drive] ... thus basing the whole edition on a complete misunderstanding since Trieb and instinct have nothing in common". Bruno Bettelheim went still further, arguing that "anyone who reads Freud only in Strachey's English translation cannot understand Freud's concern with man's soul."

While accepting that "Strachey's translation was also an act of interpretation and it has not been hard to find spots where he went astray", the fact remains that "Freud was delighted with the work Strachey succeeded in doing"; whilst even into the twenty-first century "the German editions have relied on Strachey's editorial apparatus, which should be a testimony to what he accomplished."

== James Strachey, Michael Holroyd, and Lytton Strachey ==
James is mentioned in the text of Holroyd's Lytton Strachey: A Critical Biography, and in the introduction to the 1971 Penguin edition and the 1994–95 revised edition. James was the literary executor for his brother Lytton, so Holroyd saw James and Alix frequently over the five years from 1962 that he was researching and writing the first edition (published in 1967–68) of his biography of Lytton. He describes James as "almost an exact replica of Freud himself, though with some traces of Lytton's physiognomy – the slightly bulbous nose in particular. He wore a short white beard because, he told me, of the difficulty of shaving. He had had it now for some fifty years. He also wore spectacles, one lens of which was transparent, the other translucent. It was only later that I learnt he had overcome with extraordinary patience a series of eye operations that had threatened to put an end to his magnum opus".

James made many objections to Holroyd's initial drafts of the biography, and "Holroyd made the brilliant decision to publish James's acid-sounding comments as footnotes on the pages. ... James's testy objections helped liven up the text".

James was also an authority on Haydn, Mozart and Wagner, and contributed notes and commentaries to Glyndebourne programmes.

== See also ==
- Ignacio Matte Blanco (1908–1995), Chilean psychoanalyst, supervised by Strachey and Anna Freud at the British Psychoanalytical Society
