= Lytton Strachey =

English writer and critic (1880–1932)

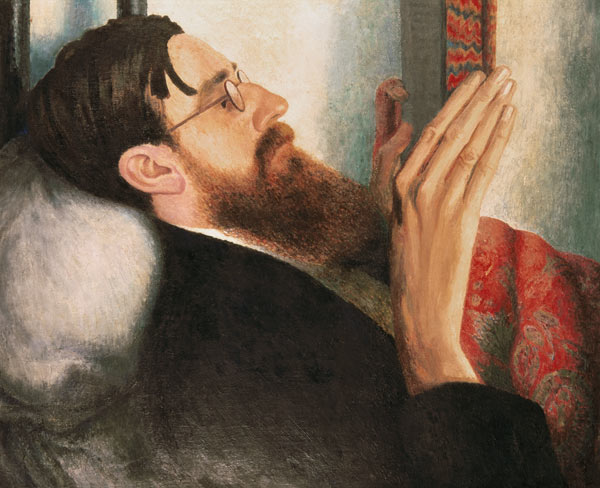
- A study of Strachey's face and hands by Carrington
- Born: Giles Lytton Strachey; 1 March 1880; London, England
- Died: 21 January 1932 (aged 51); Ham, Wiltshire, England
- Education: University of Liverpool; Trinity College, Cambridge
- Occupations: Author, critic
- Parent(s): Sir Richard Strachey; Jane Grant

Giles Lytton Strachey (/ˈdʒaɪlz ˈlɪtən ˈstreɪtʃi/; 1 March 1880 – 21 January 1932) was an English writer and critic. A founding member of the Bloomsbury Group and author of Eminent Victorians, he established a new form of biography in which psychological insight and sympathy are combined with irreverence and wit. His biography Queen Victoria (1921) was awarded the James Tait Black Memorial Prize.

== Early life and education ==
=== Youth ===
Strachey was born on 1 March 1880 at Stowey House, Clapham Common, London, the fifth son and 11th child of Lieutenant General Sir Richard Strachey, an officer in the British colonial armed forces, and his second wife, the former Jane Grant, who became a leading supporter of the women's suffrage movement. He was named Giles Lytton after an early 16th-century Gyles Strachey and the first Earl of Lytton, who had been a friend of Richard Strachey's when he was Viceroy of India in the late 1870s. The Earl of Lytton was also Lytton Strachey's godfather. The Stracheys had thirteen children in total, ten of whom survived to adulthood, including Lytton's sister Dorothy Strachey and youngest brother, the psychoanalyst James Strachey.

When Lytton was four years old the family moved from Stowey House to 69 Lancaster Gate, north of Kensington Gardens. This was their home until Sir Richard retired 20 years later. Lady Strachey was an enthusiast for languages and literature, making her children perform their own plays and write verse from an early age. She thought that Lytton had the potential to become a great artist so she decided that he would receive the best education possible to be "enlightened." By 1887 he had begun the study of French, and he was to admire French culture throughout his life.

Strachey was educated at a series of schools, beginning at Parkstone, Dorset. This was a small school with a wide range of after-class activities, where Strachey's acting skills exceeded those of other pupils; he was particularly convincing when portraying female parts. He told his mother how much he liked dressing as a woman in real life to confuse and entertain others.

Lady Strachey decided in 1893 that her son should start his more serious education and sent him to Abbotsholme School in Rocester, Derbyshire, where pupils were required to do manual work every day. Strachey, who always had a fragile physique, objected to this requirement and after a few months, he was transferred to Leamington College, where he became a victim of savage bullying. Sir Richard, however, told his son to "grin and bear the petty bullying." Strachey did eventually adapt to the school and became one of its best pupils. In the 1960s one of the four 'houses' at the school was named after him. His health also seems to have improved during the three years he spent at Leamington, although various illnesses continued to plague him.

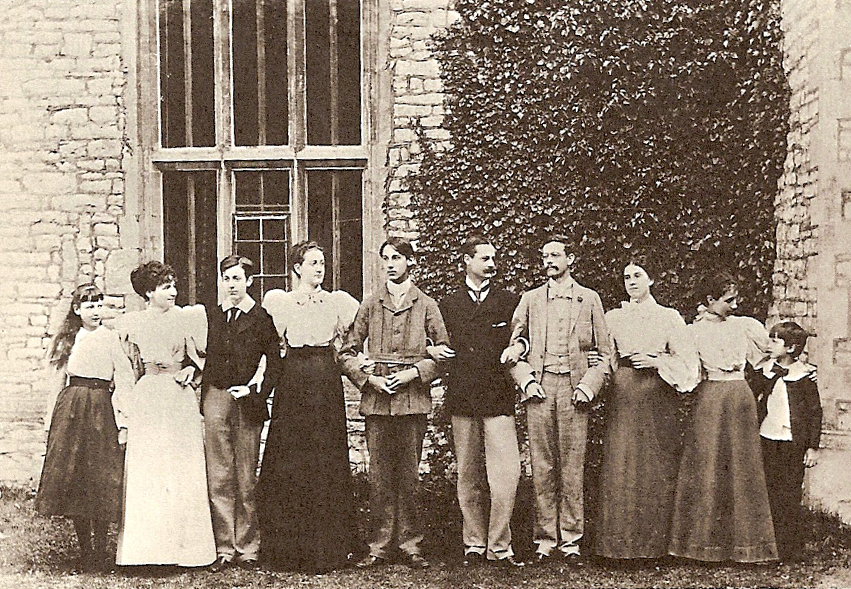
Sons and daughters of Sir Richard Strachey and Lady Strachey. Left to right: Marjorie, Dorothy, Lytton, Joan Pernel, Oliver, Dick, Ralph, Philippa, Elinor, James

When Strachey turned 17 in 1897, Lady Strachey decided that he was ready to leave school and go to university, but because she thought he was too young for Oxford she decided that he should first attend a smaller institution, the University of Liverpool. There Strachey befriended the professor of modern literature, Walter Raleigh, who, besides being his favourite teacher, also became the most influential figure in his life before he went up to Cambridge. In 1899 Strachey took the Christ Church scholarship examination, wanting to get into Balliol College, Oxford, but the examiners determined that Strachey's academic achievements were not remarkable and were struck by his "shyness and nervousness." They recommended Lincoln College as a more suitable institution, advice that Lady Strachey took as an insult, deciding then that he would attend Trinity College, Cambridge, instead.

=== Cambridge ===
Strachey was admitted as a Pensioner at Trinity College, Cambridge, on 30 September 1899. He became an Exhibitioner in 1900 and a Scholar in 1902. He won the Chancellor's Medal for English Verse in 1902 and was given a BA degree after he had won a second class in the History Tripos in June 1903. He did not however take leave of Trinity but remained until October 1905 to work on a thesis that he hoped would gain him a fellowship. Strachey was often ill and had to leave Cambridge repeatedly to recover from the palpitations that affected him.

Strachey's years at Cambridge were happy and productive. Among the freshers at Trinity, there were three with whom Strachey soon became closely associated: Clive Bell, Leonard Woolf and Saxon Sydney-Turner. With another undergraduate, A. J. Robertson, these students formed a group called the Midnight Society, which, in the opinion of Bell, was the source of the Bloomsbury Group. Other close friends at Cambridge were Thoby Stephen and his sisters Vanessa and Virginia Stephen (later Bell and Woolf respectively).

Strachey also belonged to the Conversazione Society, the Cambridge Apostles to which Tennyson, Hallam, Maurice, and Sterling had once belonged. The Apostles formulated an elitist doctrine of "Higher Sodomy" which differentiated the homosexual acts of the intelligent from those of "ordinary" men. In these years Strachey was highly prolific in writing verse, much of which has been preserved and some of which was published at the time. Strachey also became acquainted with other men who greatly influenced him, including G. Lowes Dickinson, John Maynard Keynes, Walter Lamb (brother of the painter Henry Lamb), George Mallory, Bertrand Russell and G. E. Moore. Moore's philosophy, with its assumption that the summum bonum lies in achieving a high quality of humanity, in experiencing delectable states of mind, and in intensifying experience by contemplating great works of art, was a particularly important influence.

In the summer of 1903, Strachey applied for a position in the education department of the Civil Service. Even though the letters of recommendation written for him by those under whom he had studied showed that he was held in high esteem at Cambridge, he failed to get the appointment and decided to try for a fellowship at Trinity College. From 1903 through 1905 he wrote a 400-page dissertation on Warren Hastings, the 18th-century Indian imperialist, but the work failed to secure Strachey the fellowship and led to his return to London.

== Career ==
=== Beginnings ===
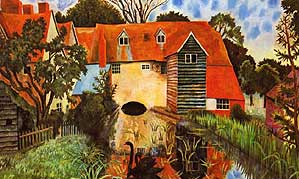
A painting by Dora Carrington of the "Mill House", Tidmarsh, Pangbourne, on the upper Thames, where much of Queen Victoria was written

After Strachey left Cambridge in 1905, his mother assigned him a bed-sitting room at 69 Lancaster Gate. After the family moved to 67 Belsize Park Gardens in Hampstead, and later to another house in the same street, he was assigned other bed-sitters. But, as he was about to turn 30, family life started irritating him, and he took to travelling into the country more often, supporting himself by writing reviews and critical articles for The Spectator and other periodicals. In 1909 he spent some weeks at a health spa in Saltsjöbaden, near Stockholm in Sweden. In this period he also lived for a while in a cottage on Dartmoor and about 1911–12 spent a whole winter at East Ilsley on the Berkshire Downs. During this time he decided to grow a beard, which became his most characteristic feature. On 9 May 1911 he wrote to his mother:

The chief news is that I have grown a beard! Its colour is very much admired, and it is generally considered extremely effective, though some ill-bred persons have been observed to laugh. It is a red-brown of the most approved tint and makes me look like a French decadent poet—or something equally distinguished.

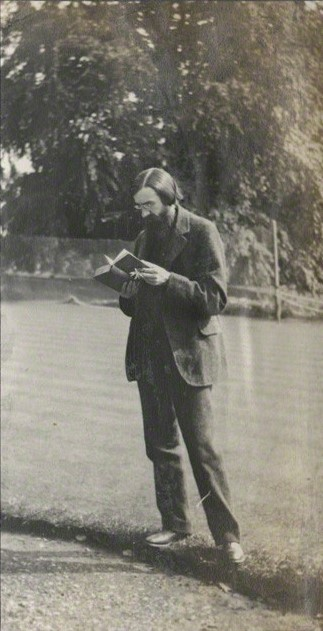
Strachey photographed by Lady Ottoline Morrell in 1911 or 1912

In 1911 H. A. L. Fisher, a former President of the British Academy and the Board of Education, was in search of someone to write a short one-volume survey of French literature. Fisher had read one of Strachey's reviews ("Two Frenchmen," Independent Review (1903)) and asked him to write an outline in 50,000 words, giving him J. W. Mackail's Latin Literature (1909) as a model. Landmarks in French Literature, dedicated to "J[ane] M[aria] S[trachey]," his mother, was published on 12 January 1912. Despite almost a full column of praise in The Times Literary Supplement of 1 February and sales that by April 1914 had reached nearly 12,000 copies in the British Empire and America, the book brought Strachey neither the fame he craved nor the money he badly needed.

=== Eminent Victorians and later career ===
Soon after the publication of Landmarks, Strachey's mother and his friend Harry Norton supported him financially. Each provided him with £100, which, together with his earnings from the Edinburgh Review and other periodicals, made it possible for him to rent a small thatched cottage, The Lacket, outside the village of Lockeridge, near Marlborough, Wiltshire. He lived there until 1916 and it was there that he wrote the first three parts of Eminent Victorians.

Strachey's theory of biography was now fully developed and mature. He was greatly influenced by Dostoyevsky, whose novels he had been reading and reviewing as they appeared in Constance Garnett's translations. The influence of Freud was important in Strachey's later works, most notably on Elizabeth and Essex, but not at this earlier stage.

In 1916 Lytton Strachey was back in London, living with his mother at 6 Belsize Park Gardens, Hampstead, where she had now moved. In the late autumn of 1917, however, his brother Oliver and his friends Harry Norton, John Maynard Keynes, and Saxon Sydney-Turner agreed to pay the rent on the Mill House at Tidmarsh, near Pangbourne, Berkshire.

From 1904 to 1914 Strachey contributed book and theatre reviews to The Spectator. Under the pseudonym "Ignotus", he also published several drama reviews.

During the First World War, Strachey applied for recognition as a conscientious objector, but in the event, he was granted exemption from military service on health grounds. He spent much of the war with like-minded people such as Lady Ottoline Morrell and the Bloomsburys.

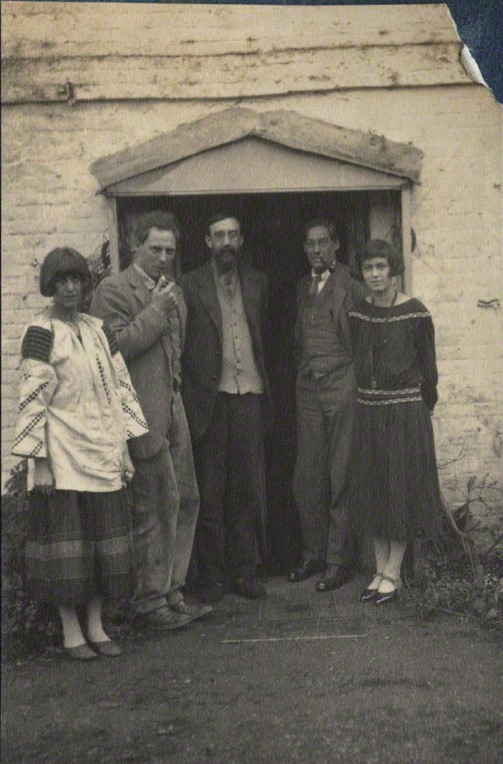
Dora Carrington, Ralph Partridge, Lytton and Oliver Strachey, and Frances Partridge; snapshot by Ottoline Morrell, 1923

His first great success, and his most famous achievement, was Eminent Victorians (1918), a collection of four short biographies of Victorian heroes. Unlike any biography of its time, Eminent Victorians examines the career and psychology of historical figures by using literary devices such as paradox, antithesis, hyperbole, and irony. This work was followed by another in the same style, Queen Victoria (1921).

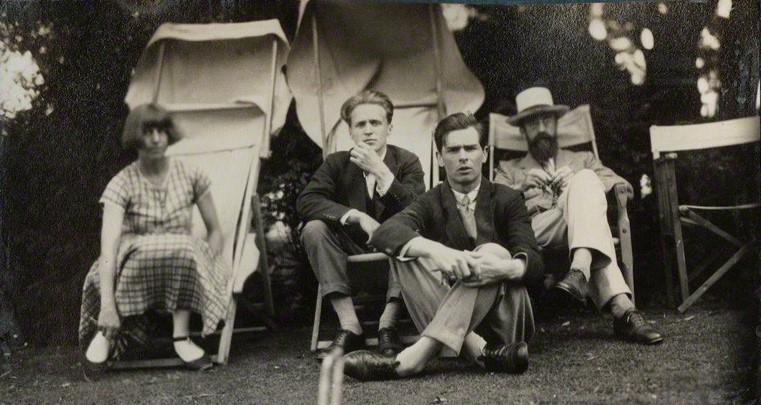
Dora Carrington; Stephen Tomlin; Walter John Herbert ('Sebastian') Sprott; Lytton Strachey, June 1926

From then on, Strachey needed no further financial aid. He continued to live at Tidmarsh until 1924 when he moved to Ham Spray House near Marlborough, Wiltshire. This was his home for the rest of his life.

== Death ==
Strachey died of stomach cancer, originally misdiagnosed as paratyphoid fever, on 21 January 1932, aged 51. It is reported that his final words were: "If this is dying, then I don't think much of it."

== Personal life and sexuality ==
Strachey spoke openly about his homosexuality with his Bloomsbury friends and had relationships with a variety of men including Ralph Partridge. He had a "passionate love affair" with the economist John Maynard Keynes, another Bloomsbury member, who was bisexual.

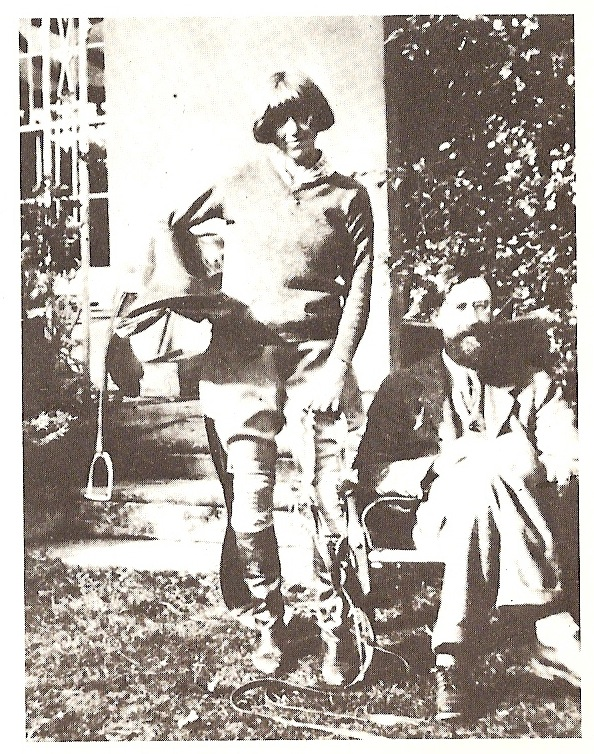
Dora Carrington and Lytton Strachey at Ham Spray

Strachey met the painter Dora Carrington during the First World War and they had a strong but platonic relationship thereafter until his death. They eventually established a permanent home together at Ham Spray House, where Carrington would paint and Strachey would educate her in literature. In 1921, Carrington agreed to marry Partridge, not for love but to secure a three-way relationship. Partridge eventually formed a relationship with Frances Marshall, another Bloomsbury member. Shortly after Strachey died, Carrington took her own life. Partridge married Marshall in 1933. Strachey was mainly interested sexually in Partridge, as well as in various other young men, including a secret sadomasochistic relationship with Roger Senhouse, later the head of the publishing house Secker & Warburg. Strachey's letters, edited by Paul Levy, were published in 2005.

== In popular culture ==
Virginia Woolf's husband Leonard Woolf said that in her experimental novel The Waves, "there is something of Lytton in Neville". Lytton is also said to have been the inspiration behind the character of St John Hirst in her novel The Voyage Out. Michael Holroyd describes Strachey as the inspiration behind Cedric Furber in Wyndham Lewis's The Self-Condemned. In Lewis's novel The Apes of God he is seen in the character of Matthew Plunkett, whom Holroyd describes as "a maliciously distorted and hilarious caricature of Lytton". In the Terminus Note in E. M. Forster's Maurice, Forster remarks that the Cambridge undergraduate Risley in the novel is based on Strachey.

Jonathan Pryce as Strachey, Steven Waddington as Ralph Partridge and Emma Thompson as Dora Carrington in the film Carrington

Strachey was portrayed by Jonathan Pryce in the film Carrington (1995), which won the Jury Prize at the Cannes Film Festival that year, while Pryce won Best Actor for his performance. In the film Al sur de Granada (2003), Strachey was portrayed by James Fleet.

Strachey was portrayed by Ed Birch in the 2015 mini-series Life in Squares.

Strachey was portrayed by Nigel Planer as Lytton Scratchy in Gloomsbury, by Sue Limb, a parody of the Bloomsbury Group. The comedy sitcom ran for five series from 2012 to 2018 on BBC Radio 4.

Strachey was portrayed by Simon Russell Beale in the 2020 BBC Radio 3 play Elizabeth and Essex by Robin Brooks.

== Works ==
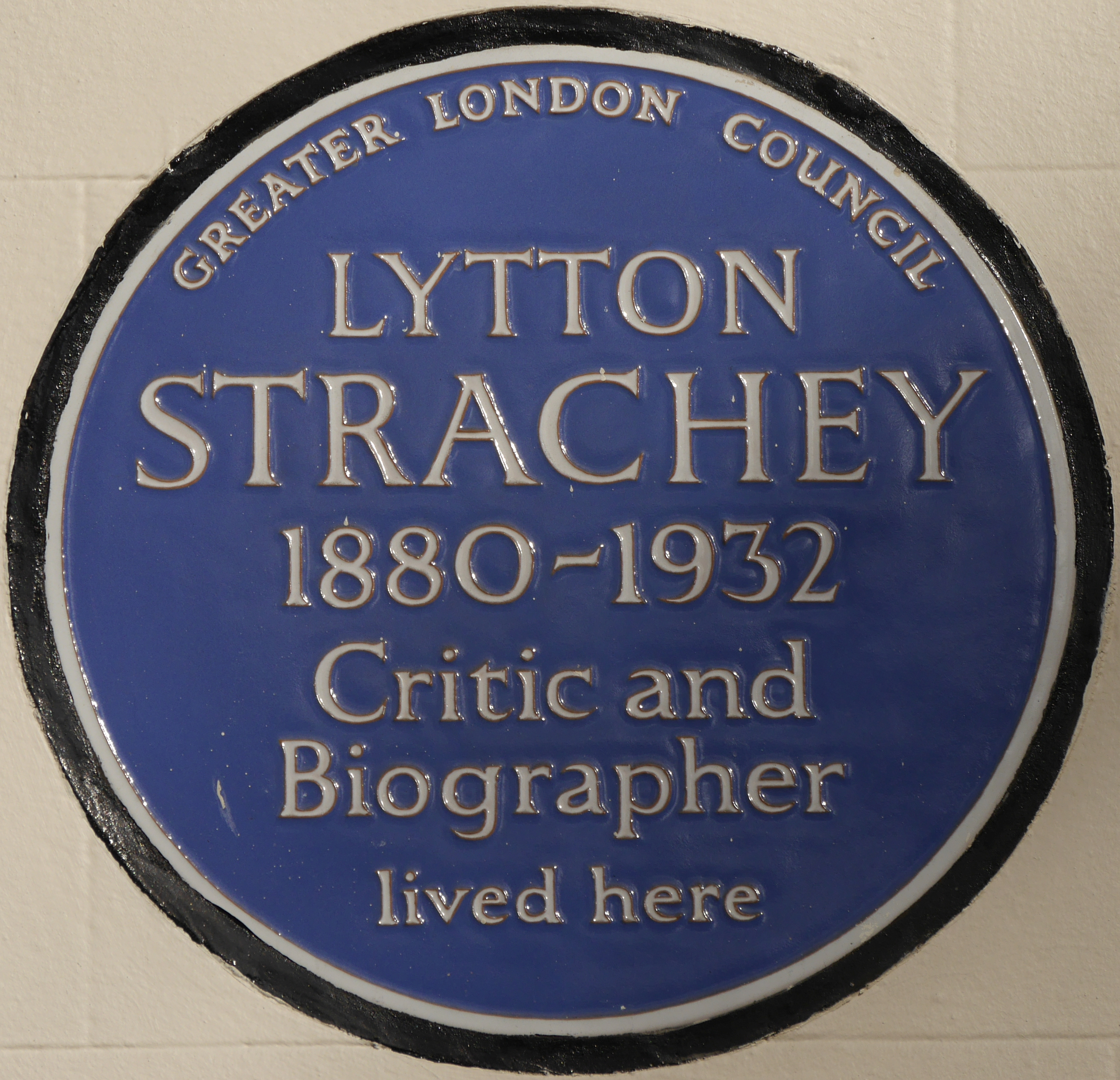
Blue plaque, 51 Gordon Square

=== Academic works and biographies ===
- Landmarks in French Literature (1912)
- Eminent Victorians: Cardinal Manning, Florence Nightingale, Dr Arnold, General Gordon (1918)
- Queen Victoria (1921)
- Books and Characters (1922)
- Elizabeth and Essex: A Tragic History (1928)
- Portraits in Miniature and Other Essays (1931)

=== Posthumous publications ===
- Characters and Commentaries, ed. James Strachey (1933)
- Spectatorial Essays, ed. James Strachey (1964)
- Ermyntrude and Esmeralda. An Entertainment, illus. Erté (1969)
- Lytton Strachey by Himself: A Self-Portrait, ed. Michael Holroyd (1971) (ISBN 978-0-349-11812-3)
- The Really Interesting Question, and Other Papers, ed. Paul Levy (1972)
- The Shorter Strachey, ed. Michael Holroyd and Paul Levy (1980)
- The Letters of Lytton Strachey, ed. Paul Levy (2005) (ISBN 0-670-89112-6)
- Unpublished Works of Lytton Strachey: Early Papers, ed. Todd Avery (2011)

== Sources ==
- Bell, Millicent. "Lytton Strachey's Eminent Victorians" in Meyers, Jeffrey (ed.) The Biographer's Art, London: Macmillan, 1989, 53–55.
- Diment, G. "Nabokov and Strachey". Comparative Literature Studies 27.4 (1990): 285–97.
- Ferns, John. Lytton Strachey, Boston: Twayne, 1988.
- Fromm, Harold. "Holroyd/Strachey/Shaw: Art and Archives in Literary Biography", The Hudson Review, 42.2 (1989): 201–221.
- Hattersley, Roy. "Lytton Strachey's Elegant, Energetic Character Assassinations Destroyed For Ever the Pretensions of the Victorian Age to Moral Supremacy", New Statesman (12 August 2002)
- Holroyd, Michael. Lytton Strachey, 1994, ISBN 0-09-933291-4 (paperback)
- Kallich, Martin. The Psychological Milieu of Lytton Strachey, NY: Bookman Associates, 1961.
- MacCarthy, Desmond. Lytton Strachey: The Art of Biography, "Sunday Times" 5 November 1933: 8.
- Sanders, Charles Richard. Lytton Strachey: his mind and art, New Haven: Yale University Press, 1957.
- Taddeo, Julie Anne Taddeo. Lytton Strachey and the Search for Modern Sexual Identity, Binghamton: Harrington Park Press, 2002.
