= Alpujarra de la Sierra =

Coordinates: 36°56′N 03°09′W

- municipality
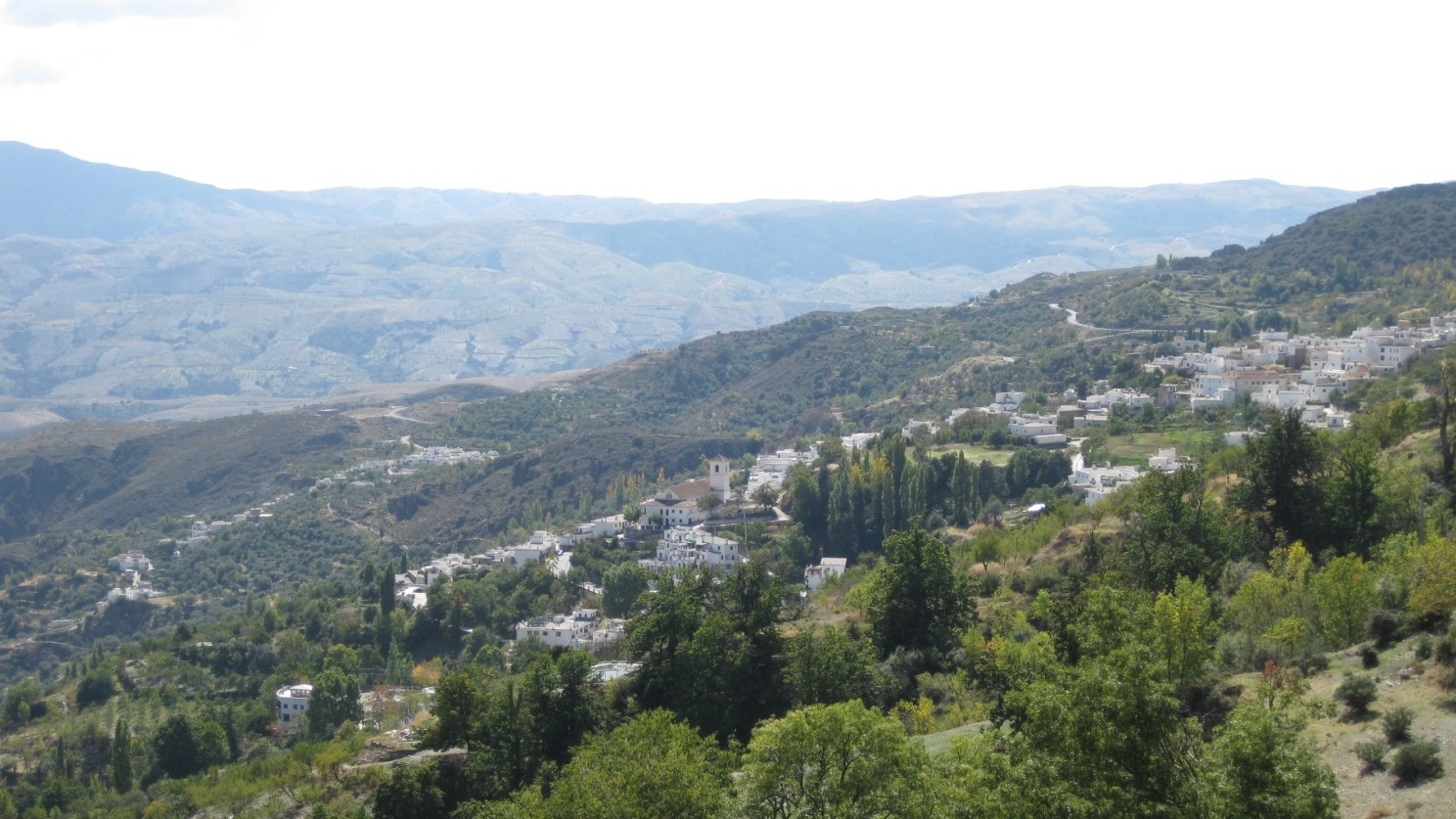

- Flag Coat of arms

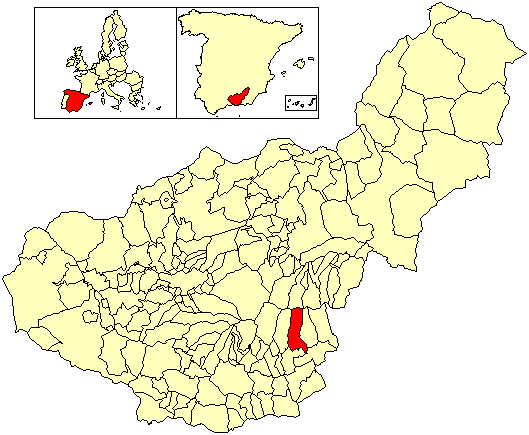
- Location of Alpujarra de la Sierra
- Country: Spain
- Province: Granada
- Municipality: Alpujarra de la Sierra

Area
  - Total: 69 km^{2} (27 sq mi)
- Elevation: 1,110 m (3,640 ft)

Population (2025-01-01)
  - Total: 933
  - Density: 14/km^{2} (35/sq mi)
- Time zone: UTC+1 (CET)
  - Summer (DST): UTC+2 (CEST)

Alpujarra de la Sierra is a municipality located in the province of Granada, Spain. According to the 2007 census (INE), the city has a population of 1,168 inhabitants.

== History ==
It was formed by the union in 1971 of Mecina Bombarón and Yegen, and is situated in the central-northern area of La Alpujarra (Granada), 108 km from the provincial capital, in the south-east of Spain. It is bounded by the municipalities of Lanteira, Válor, Ugíjar, Cádiar and Bérchules.

Its council was formed from the centres of Mecina Bombarón, Yegen and Golco, together with the cortijada (hamlet/farmstead) of Montenegro, Spain.

The municipality lies on the southern slopes of the Sierra Nevada mountains, and the houses look out towards the Mediterranean Sea in the distance. Its terraced farmlands are watered by the melting snow from above, giving rise to a high-altitude oasis of greenery above the arid foothills below.

Alpujarra de La Sierra is one of over 50 villages in the area, which were the last stronghold of the Spanish Muslims, or Moors. Soon after the Castilians took Granada in 1492, all the region's Moors were forced to convert to Christianity. Those who refused took to the hills, settling in this remote, inaccessible area. Alpujarra de la Sierra retains its traditional Berber architecture and has many quaint white houses with flat clay roofs lining narrow streets.

Author Gerald Brenan, who wrote South from Granada, was a resident of Alpujarra de la Sierra. He rebuilt a ruined house (now marked with a plaque in his memory) and was visited by many of his friends of the famous Bloomsbury group. In his book, Brenan describes the everyday life of Yegen in the 1920s.

== See also ==
- List of municipalities in Granada
- Rebellion of the Alpujarras (1568–1571)
