= Ralph Partridge =

British soldier and pacifist

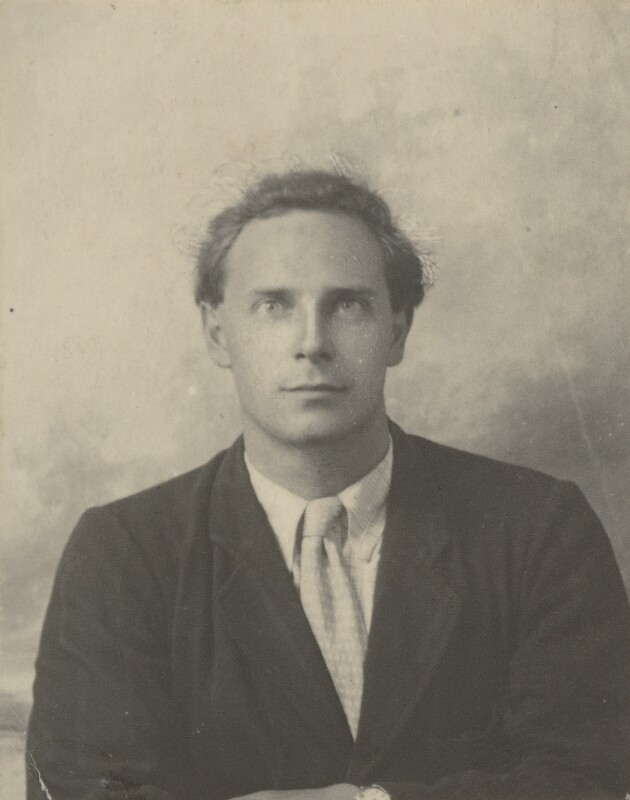
Ralph Partridge (c.1918)

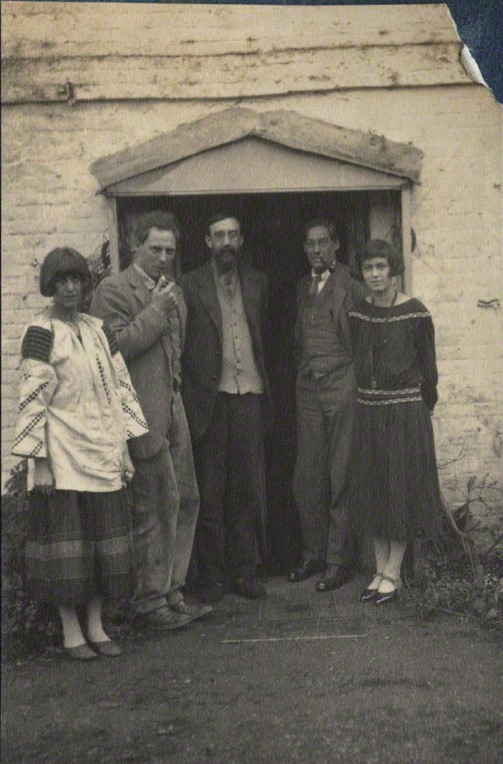
Dora Carrington, Ralph Partridge, Lytton and Oliver Strachey, and Frances Marshall (later Partridge); snapshot by Lady Ottoline Morrell, 1923

Reginald Sherring Partridge, MC & Bar (1894 – 30 November 1960), generally known as Ralph Partridge, was a member of the Bloomsbury Group. He worked for Leonard Woolf and Virginia Woolf, married Dora Carrington and then Frances Marshall, and was the unrequited love of Lytton Strachey.

== Biography ==
Partridge was born in 1894, the son of (William) Reginald Partridge, magistrate and collector of the North-Western Provinces and Oudh for the Indian Civil Service, and Jessie (née Sherring). His father was the son of a Devon solicitor while, on his mother's side, the Sherring family were clerics and Christian missionaries working in India at Varanasi. In his childhood Partridge had been known as 'Rex'.

He was educated at Westminster School where he was Head Boy. Partridge won a scholarship to read Classics at Christ Church, Oxford, and rowed for Oxford University. He was commissioned during World War I, joining the 6th Battalion of the Royal Warwickshire Regiment and was seconded to the 48th Division Cyclist Company, returning to his regiment after a year. He reached the rank of major by the age of twenty-three, winning a Military Cross and bar and the Croix de Guerre.

Partridge was an Oxford friend of Dora Carrington's younger brother Noel. They met in 1918. Partridge fell in love with Carrington and eventually, in 1921, Carrington agreed to marry him even if she was in love with Lytton Strachey. Strachey was himself more interested in Partridge. An added complication was Dora Carrington's intermittent affair with one of Partridge's best friends, Gerald Brenan. Carrington, Partridge, and Strachey shared a Wiltshire farm-house, Ham Spray, in a complex relationship later recorded in the 1995 film Carrington. Though Strachey spoke openly about his homosexuality with his Bloomsbury friends, and had relationships with a variety of men including Partridge, details of Strachey's sexuality were not widely known until the publication of a biography by Michael Holroyd in the late 1960s.

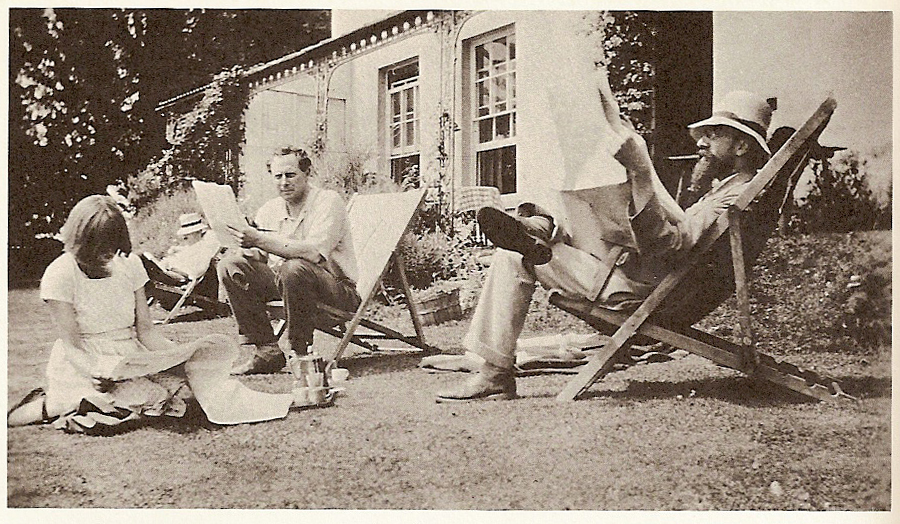
Dora Carrington, Ralph Partridge and Lytton Strachey

In 1926, Partridge left Carrington to live with Frances Marshall, whom he had met while she was working at the London bookshop owned by David Garnett and Francis Birrell; at that time Partridge was working for Leonard Woolf and Virginia Woolf at the Hogarth Press. Meanwhile, Carrington had an affair with Bernard 'Beakus' Penrose, who was a friend of Partridge. After Carrington died by suicide in 1932, shortly after Lytton Strachey's death, Ralph and Frances married in 1933. The couple had one son, (Lytton) Burgo Partridge (1935–1963). They lived in London during the week and repaired to Ham Spray at weekends. They lived happily at Ham Spray until Ralph's death in 1960. Frances, the last surviving member and diarist of the Bloomsbury Group died, aged 103, in 2004.

== In popular culture ==
=== Books ===
- A Pacifist's War (Hogarth Press, 1978) by Frances Partridge is an account of Ralph and Frances' life as pacifists during World War II, when Ralph refused to join the Home Guard, finally being recognised as a conscientious objector by the Appellate Tribunal.

=== Films ===
- Steven Waddington portrays Partridge in the 1995 British biographical film Carrington written and directed by Christopher Hampton based on the book Lytton Strachey by Michael Holroyd.
- Christian Coulson portrays Partridge in the 2002 British-American drama film The Hours directed by Stephen Daldry based on the 1998 Pulitzer Prize-winning novel of the same name by Michael Cunningham.
- Laurence Fox portrays Partridge in the 2003 Goya Award winning Spanish film Al sur de Granada, written and directed by Fernando Colomo, based on the 1957 autobiographical book South from Granada by Gerald Brenan.
- Nathan Stewart-Jarrett portrays Partridge in the 2018 film Vita & Virginia, directed by Chanya Button. The screenplay, written by Button and Eileen Atkins, is adapted from the 1992 play Vita & Virginia by Atkins.
