= Joanna Carrington =

British artist

- Born: 6 November 1931; Hampstead, London
- Died: 13 November 2003 (aged 72); Poitiers, France
- Education: East Anglian School of Painting and Drawing; Central School of Art and Design
- Known for: Painting
- Spouses: Mick Pilcher, divorced; Christopher Mason, m.1966-2003, her death

Joanna Carrington (6 November 1931 – 13 November 2003) was a British artist.

== Biography ==
Carrington was born at Hampstead in north London into an artistic family, her father being the publisher and designer Noel Carrington while the artist Dora Carrington, who she never met, was an aunt. At the start of World War II, the family moved to Lambourn in Berkshire where her father worked on a farm and Joanna Carrington developed what would become a life-long love of the countryside. Aged seventeen she studied at the summer school in East Anglia run by Cedric Morris, who was greatly impressed by her talent for painting. Carrington then moved to Paris where she studied in the studio of Fernand Léger. Returning to England, Carrington studied at the Central School of Art and Design in London from 1949 to 1952, where she was taught by both Mervyn Peake and Keith Vaughan. While at the Central, Carrington won a Queen's Scholarship and was included in a group exhibition, Six Young Contemporaries at the Institute of Contemporary Arts in central London during 1952.

Carrington spent some time in Nigeria with her first husband, the designer Mick Pilcher, but appears to have done little, if any, painting there. When the couple split up she returned to London, took a studio in Notting Hill and began exhibiting again. Her first solo exhibition was at The Establishment club's gallery in Greek Street in Soho during 1962. She began teaching and at various times held posts at the Hornsey School of Art, the Byam Shaw School of Art and at Regent Street Polytechnic. In 1966, Carrington married the artist and film director Christopher Mason and exhibited works at the Upper Grosvenor Gallery and at Crane Arts. Carrington contributed a series of articles on painting to the women's page of The Times, which were eventually published in book form as Landscape Painting for Beginners in 1971.

In 1973, after Mason made a film on the naive artist Alfred Wallis, Carrington adopted the pseudonym Reg Pepper. As Pepper, Carrington produced paintings in a primitive style which she exhibited on several occasions at the Portal Gallery in London. Even after her identity was revealed, by the Sunday Times in 1981, Carrington's Pepper work continued to sell well. In 1984, as Pepper, Carrington was commissioned to illustrate a children's book which was published as Pepper and Jam.

From 1979 onwards, Carrington and Mason began spending more time in France and Carrington began a series of landscape paintings, which were clearly influenced by the post-impressionist art she loved. The couple lived at a number of locations in France, at Brittany, at Saint-Savin-sur-Gartempe and latterly in Poitiers. Carrington continued to exhibit in England and had exhibitions at several commercial galleries including at the Sue Rankin Gallery, the Thackeray, the Grosvenor and Crane. Her husband published a memoir of Carrington in 2005 to coincide with a memorial exhibition of her work at the Thackeray Gallery.
