= Spain: A History =

Book by Raymond Carr

- Editor: Raymond Carr
- Language: English
- Subject: History of Spain
- Published: 2000 (Oxford University Press)
- Pages: 318 (hardcover/paperback edition)
- ISBN: 0-19-820619-4

Spain: A History is a 2000 book edited by Raymond Carr and published by Oxford University Press.

== Summary ==
The work is a history of Spain chiefly over the course of 2000 years, though with some consideration of earlier periods; one part of it, for instance, describes the existence of Homo antecessor (a predecessor of human beings) who has been unearthed as living in what is now Spain 800,000 years ago, as well as the discovery of Neanderthal remains in a place such as Gibraltar.

The book is a compilation of essays on Spanish history over the long-term, with contributions by Sebastian Balfour, Roger Collins, A. T. Fear, Felipe Fernández-Armesto, Richard Fletcher, Richard Herr, Henry Kamen, and Angus Mackay (as well as Carr himself).

Underlying themes unite much of the analysis in the book. For example, the notion that Spanish society has tended to resist progressions and changes is debunked, as is the idea that Spain's power rose historically as a result of its isolation from other societies in Europe.

The book concludes with a consideration of contemporary Spain as an integrated member of the European Union and how that development relates to its past.
