= South from Granada (film) =

- Promotional Poster
- Spanish: Al sur de Granada
- Directed by: Fernando Colomo
- Screenplay by: Fernando Colomo; Jonathan Gathorne-Hardy
- Produced by: Beatriz de la Gándara; Fernando Bovaira; Gustavo Ferrada
- Starring: Matthew Goode; Verónica Sánchez; Guillermo Toledo; Ángela Molina; Antonio Resines
- Cinematography: José Luis Alcaine
- Edited by: Antonio Lara
- Music by: Juan Bardem
- Production companies: Fernando Colomo PC; Sogecine
- Distributed by: Warner Sogefilms
- Release date: 10 January 2003
- Country: Spain
- Languages: Spanish; English

South from Granada (Spanish: Al sur de Granada) is a 2003 Spanish comedy film directed by Fernando Colomo which stars Matthew Goode as Gerald Brenan (author of South from Granada), a demobilized British soldier who in 1919 rents a house for a year in a village in Alpujarra, alongside Verónica Sánchez and Guillermo Toledo.

== Plot ==
Brenan arrives at Yegen on foot, interrupting the funeral held for the daughter of the local cacique. He collapses from dysentery and soon learns that the local cacique, Don Fernando, is leaving for Granada with his wife. Brenan rents Fernando's house for a year and soon enlists the services of María as housekeeper and cook and becomes friends with a local man named Paco. Brenan spends most of his time reading, walking, and trying to write poetry.

His friends Dora Carrington, Lytton Strachey (who is ill), and Ralph Partridge visit for a couple of days. Brenan, who has been maintaining a correspondence with Carrington, learns during the visit that Partridge and Carrington are engaged. He is crushed, as he had been in love with Carrington.

One day, Carrington decides to paint the portrait of a local 16-year-old girl, Juliana. Brenan, who had previously seen Juliana bathing naked in a river, falls in love with her. Paco gives him advice on how to win her heart. Brenan, who is quickly learning Spanish and who is called “Don Geraldo” by the locals, decides to make Juliana jealous by accompanying Ángeles, the daughter of María, to church. This backfires, as María now wishes for Brenan to marry Ángeles. Brenan then enlists the services of Juliana as a second housekeeper. Juliana, however, clashes with María. María believes Juliana and her mother are witches. María has a baby: it is Don Fernando's baby. Brenan is still unable to get close to Juliana and now has two angry women in his home. María sends a naked Ángeles to Brenan's bed in order to seduce him, but Brenan refuses to sleep with her. As the women continue to fight, Brenan becomes increasingly frustrated, and finally kicks María out of his home (at gunpoint). He and Juliana then finally embark on a relationship. When Ralph Partridge visits again, this time with his new fiancée, Brenan and Juliana join him on a day trip to the beach. Juliana feels that Brenan and Partridge are laughing at her.

When Brenan leaves for Granada with his friends, he fears that Juliana will cheat on him in anger. He asks Paco to watch over her to prevent any of the village boys from seducing her. While Brenan is gone, Paco and Juliana sleep with one another. Brenan is angered when he discovers this, but Juliana convinces him that she still wishes to have Brenan's child, regardless of whether they are married or not. They resume their relationship and soon Juliana is pregnant. When Brenan is required to return to England temporarily, Juliana fears that he will never return and that she will have to give birth to, and raise, their child alone.

Brenan returns three years later. He is now married to Gamel Woolsey, an American poet. Paco announces he will sell his property to fulfill his dream of immigrating to Buenos Aires. He inquires after Lytton Strachey and Dora Carrington. Lytton has died, and Carrington has committed suicide as a result. Juliana's child, Elena (named after Brenan's mother Helen) is now three. She reproves Brenan for not returning to Yegen earlier, but in the end allows him to take their child to be educated and looked after.

The film then fast forwards twenty years. An older Juliana runs into Brenan, Gamel, and a young Elena outside of a pastry shop. Brenan begins to introduce Juliana as Elena's real mother, but Juliana cuts him off and introduces herself to Elena as Brenan's former housekeeper at Yegen. Brenan and Juliana part ways rather quickly but catch each other glancing over their shoulders and share a smile.

== Cast ==
- Matthew Goode as Gerald Brenan
- Verónica Sánchez as Juliana
- Guillermo Toledo as Paco
- Consuelo Trujillo as María
- Ángela Molina as Doña Felicidad
- Antonio Resines as Don Virgilio
- Laurence Fox as Ralph Partridge
- Bebe Rebolledo as Ángeles
- Jessica Kate Meyer as Dora Carrington
- James Fleet as Lytton Strachey
- María Alfonsa Rosso as Doña Clara
- Sebastián Haro as Don Gabriel 'Culonegro'
- Mariana Cordero as Máxima
- Juan Margallo as Emiliano
- Sandra Wahlbeck as Gamel Woolsey
- Sauce Ena as Frances

== Production ==
The film was inspired by Gerald Brenan's biography The Interior Castle by Jonathan Gathorne-Hardy, who also collaborated in the screenplay. Colomo was inspired to make the film after seeing the character of Brenan appear in the 1995 film Carrington, about Dora Carrington. In that film, Carrington was played by Emma Thompson, and Brenan, by Samuel West.

The film was produced by Fernando Colomo PC and Sogecine, with the participation of TeleMadrid, Antena 3, and Canal+.

Matthew Goode did not know who Brenan was upon taking the role, since Brenan is more familiar to the Spanish than the English. Goode did not speak Spanish, but read Brenan's biography and learned to imitate the phonetic sounds of Spanish.

== Release ==
Distributed by Warner Sogefilms, the film was theatrically released in Spain on 10 January 2003.

== Reception ==
=== Critical response ===
Jonathan Holland of Variety deemed the film to be "a lightweight but breezily effective" and "always enjoyable" film while pointing out "its lack of seriousness".

=== Accolades ===
Year	Award	Category	Nominee(s)	Result	Ref.
2004	18th Goya Awards	Best Production Supervision	Pilar Robla	Nominated	
2004	18th Goya Awards	Best New Actress	Verónica Sánchez	Nominated	
2004	18th Goya Awards	Best Cinematography	José Luis Alcaine	Nominated	
2004	18th Goya Awards	Best Original Score	Miguel Bardem	Won	
2004	18th Goya Awards	Best Special Effects	Reyes Abades, Alfonso Nieto, Pablo Núñez	Nominated	
2004	13th Actors and Actresses Union Awards	Best New Actress	Verónica Sánchez	Nominated	

== See also ==
- List of Spanish films of 2003
