= Raymond Carr =

English historian

Sir Raymond Carr FBA FRHistS FRSL
- Born: 11 April 1919; Bath, Somerset, England, UK
- Died: 19 April 2015 (aged 96)
- Occupations: Historian and academic
- Spouse: Sara Ann Mary Strickland
- Children: 4

Academic background
- Education: Brockenhurst School
- Alma mater: Christ Church, Oxford

Academic work
- Institutions: University College London; All Souls College, Oxford; New College, Oxford; St Antony's College, Oxford; New York University
- Doctoral students: Frances Lannon

Sir Albert Raymond Maillard Carr FBA FRHistS FRSL (11 April 1919 – 19 April 2015) was an English historian specialising in the history of Spain, Latin America, and Sweden. From 1968 to 1987, he was Warden of St Antony's College, Oxford.

== Early life ==
Carr was born on 11 April 1919 in Bath, Somerset, to Reginald Henry Maillard Carr and his wife (Ethel Gertrude) Marion (née Graham). He was educated at Brockenhurst School, then a state secondary school in the New Forest, Hampshire. He then studied at Christ Church, Oxford, where he was elected Gladstone Research Exhibitioner in 1941.

== Career ==
Carr was briefly a lecturer at University College London, in 1945–1946, before returning to Oxford as a Fellow of All Souls College, 1946–1953. He was next a Fellow of New College, 1953–1964, then Director of Oxford's Latin American Centre, 1964–1968 and the University's Professor of the History of Latin America, 1967–68.

He became a Fellow of St Antony's College, Oxford, in 1964, Sub-Warden of the college in 1966 and Warden in 1968, a position he held until his retirement in 1987. After his retirement from Oxford, he was King Juan Carlos Professor of Spanish History at New York University in 1992.

Carr's successor as Warden of St Antony's, Ralf Dahrendorf, has described Carr's tenure of the post as the college's 'Fiesta days'.

As a historian and Hispanist, Carr's main interest lay in the vicissitudes of 19th and 20th century Spain, and he was also a specialist in Latin American and Swedish history. In the words of John Huxtable Elliott, "his book on Spain between 1808 and 1939 is basic to a better understanding of the era, and the later generation of historians, both within Spain and abroad, have followed up the leads that Carr gives in his book to great benefit."

His Modern Spain, 1875–1980 was called by the Times Literary Supplement "a turning point in Spanish historiography – nothing comparable in scope, profundity, or perceptiveness exists."

At St Antony's, he established an Iberian Centre, of which he was co-director with Joaquin Romero Maura. Paul Preston wrote in 1984 of their collaboration "Between them, Carr and Romero Maura instilled an intellectual rigour into modern Spanish historiography which had previously been conspicuously lacking." Carr also wrote an extensive foreword to the 1993 edition of The Spanish Labyrinth by Gerald Brenan.

A Fellow of the British Academy since 1978, in 1983 he was awarded the Order of Alfonso X el Sabio by King Juan Carlos of Spain and in 1999 the Prince of Asturias Award for Social Sciences.

He is considered, together with Angus Mackay and Sir John Huxtable Elliott, a major figure in developing Spanish historiography.

Carr wrote for The Spectator in 2007, "I am old-fashioned and aged enough to believe that the best history is the work of the lone individual."

His recreation was fox hunting, about which he has written two books, English Fox Hunting: A History (1976), a comprehensive history of fox-hunting from medieval times, and, with his wife Sara Carr, Fox-Hunting (1982).

== Other appointments ==
- Member of the National Theatre Board, 1968–1977
- Chairman of the Society for Latin American Studies, 1966–1968
- Corresponding Member of the Spain's Royal Academy of History (Real Academia de la Historia), Madrid

== Personal life and death ==
In 1950, Carr married Sara Ann Mary Strickland, daughter of Algernon Walter Strickland and of Lady Mary Pamela Madeline Sibell Charteris. The Carrs have three sons and one daughter. Carr died on 19 April 2015 at the age of 96.

== Honours ==
- Member of the British Academy, 1972
- Fellow of the British Academy, 1978
- Distinguished Professor, Boston University, 1980
- Honorary Student of Christ Church, Oxford, 1986
- Knight Bachelor, 1987 New Year Honours
- Fellow of the Royal Historical Society
- Fellow of the Royal Society of Literature
- Honorary Fellow of St Antony's College, Oxford, 1988
- Honorary D Litt, Complutense University of Madrid, 1999
- Award of Merit, Society for Spanish Historical Studies of the US, 1987
- Leimer Award for Spanish Studies, University of Augsburg, 1990
- Prince of Asturias Award in Social Sciences, Prince of Asturias Foundation, 1999
- Grand Cross of the Order of Alfonso X el Sabio (Spain), 1983
- Order of Infante Dom Henrique (Portugal), 1989
- Foreign Member of the American Academy of Arts and Sciences, 2004

== Clubs ==
Beefsteak and Oxford and Cambridge; sometime Senior Member of the Bullingdon.

== Selected works ==
- Two Swedish Financiers: Louis De Geer and Joel Gripenstierna, in H. E. Bell and R. L. Ollard, eds., Historical Essays Presented to David Ogg, London: Black, 1963
- Spain 1808–1939, Oxford University Press, 1966
- Latin American Affairs (ed.), Oxford University Press, 1970 (St Antony's Papers, no. 22)
- The Republic and the Civil War in Spain (ed.), 1971
- English Fox Hunting: A History, London: Weidenfeld & Nicolson, 1976, 2nd edition 1986, ISBN 978-0-297-77074-9
- The Spanish Tragedy: the Civil War in Perspective, 1977
- Spain: Dictatorship to Democracy (with Juan Pablo Fusi), 1979
- Modern Spain: 1875-1980, 1980
- Spain 1808-1975, Oxford: Clarendon Press, 1982
- Fox-Hunting (with Sara Carr), Oxford University Press, 1982, ISBN 978-0-19-214140-8
- Puerto Rico: a colonial experiment, 1984
- The Spanish Civil War: A History in Pictures (ed.), New York, W. W. Norton & Co., 1986
- The Chances of Death: a diary of the Spanish Civil War by Priscilla Scott-Ellis (ed. by Carr), 1995
- Visiones de fin de siglo, 1999
- Spain: A History (ed.), 2000
- El rostro cambiante de Clío (collection of pieces translated into Spanish by Eva Rodríguez Halffter), Madrid: Biblioteca Nueva, 2005 ISBN 84-9742-403-4

Carr has also written many book reviews for journals, including the New York Review of Books and The Spectator.
