= Buttermere (disambiguation) =

Buttermere is a lake in the English Lake District.

Buttermere may also refer to:

- Buttermere, Cumbria (village), the village by the lake
- Buttermere, Wiltshire, a village in the county of Wiltshire, England
