= Gamel Woolsey =

American poet

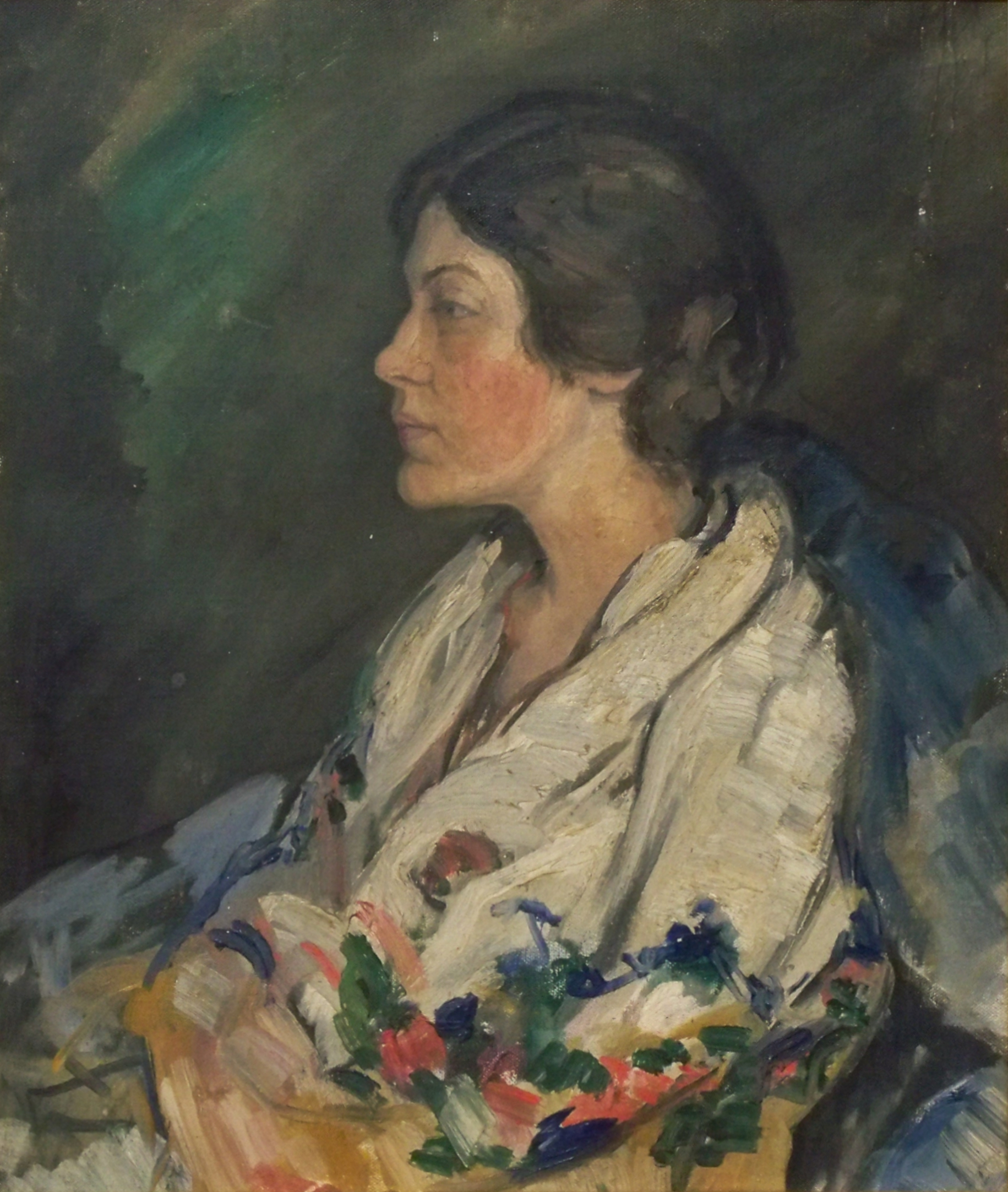
Portrait of Gamel Woolsey (Gladys Powis, 1930).

Gamel Woolsey (born Elizabeth Gammell Woolsey; May 28, 1897 – January 18, 1968) was an American poet, novelist and translator.

== Early life and education ==
Woolsey was born on the Breeze Hill plantation in Aiken, South Carolina as Elizabeth Gammell Woolsey. In later years, she took her middle name which she shortened to Gamel, a Norse word meaning "old". Her father was planter William Walton Woolsey. Woolsey was a descendant of George (Joris) Woolsey, one of the early settlers of New Amsterdam, and Thomas Cornell.

The Woolsey branch of the New England Dwight family had influence in the law, the church and education. Gamel's aunt, Sarah Chauncey Woolsey – better known by her pen name, Susan Coolidge – wrote the popular Katy series and other children's fiction. Gamel's half-brother John M. Woolsey was the judge who ruled that James Joyce's Ulysses was not obscene.

After the death of her father the family moved to Charleston, South Carolina, where Gamel went to day school.

"FORSAN ET HaEC OLIM MEMINiSSE IUVABIT"
("Perhaps one day it will be a pleasure to remember even this...")

Why should you feel remorse, regret,
For what was beautiful to me,
As uncommanded as the sea?
The winds blew and the waters sang
All summer: now that summer's done
I can remember still the sun
That lay upon the mountain grass,
And all the beauty that there was -
Only remember what was fair,
And what was wild and innocent;
The rest is blown upon the air.

== Literary career ==
Despite weak health following an attack of tuberculosis in 1915, Woolsey moved to New York City in 1921, hoping to be an actress or a writer. Her first known published poem appeared in the New York Evening Post in 1922. The following year, she met and married Rex Hunter, a writer and journalist from New Zealand. They separated after four years.

In 1927, while living in Patchin Place, Greenwich Village, she met the British writer John Cowper Powys, and through him, his brother Llewelyn and Llewelyn's wife Alyse Gregory. Llewelyn and Woolsey had a passionate and painful love affair, but Woolsey and Alyse became friends for life.

She left New York for England in 1928, settling in Dorset to be near Llewelyn, where she came to know the whole Powys family and their circle. She parted from Llewelyn in 1930. In 1933, she began an enduring friendship with the philosopher Bertrand Russell. Shortly thereafter, she met the writer Gerald Brenan. They moved to Churriana, a village near Málaga, just before the Spanish Civil War broke out, staying in Spain until the city was occupied by Italian forces sent by Mussolini to support the fascist rebels. They befriended the 72-year-old zoologist Sir Peter Chalmers Mitchell, and like Sir Peter, they provided safe haven to a right-wing sympathiser (in their case a member of the aristocratic Larios family) despite objecting to his political views. This interlude is documented in Sir Peter's memoir My House in Málaga, and in Woolsey's memoir Death’s Other Kingdom. The couple returned to England, and for many years afterward, they lived in Aldbourne in Wiltshire. They returned to Spain in 1953.

Neither of Woolsey's novels were published in her lifetime. In 1931 Middle Earth, a collection of 36 poems was published, and in 1939, she published Death's Other Kingdom, an account of her experiences during the first few months of the Spanish Civil War. She translated two books from Spanish to English: Spanish Fairy Stories (1944), and The Spendthrifts (1951), a translation of La de Bringas by Galdos which sold 70,000 copies. Her science fiction short story "The Star of Double Darkness" was published in The Saturday Evening Post in 1955. It can be read on page 145 of the Powys journal (volume viii).

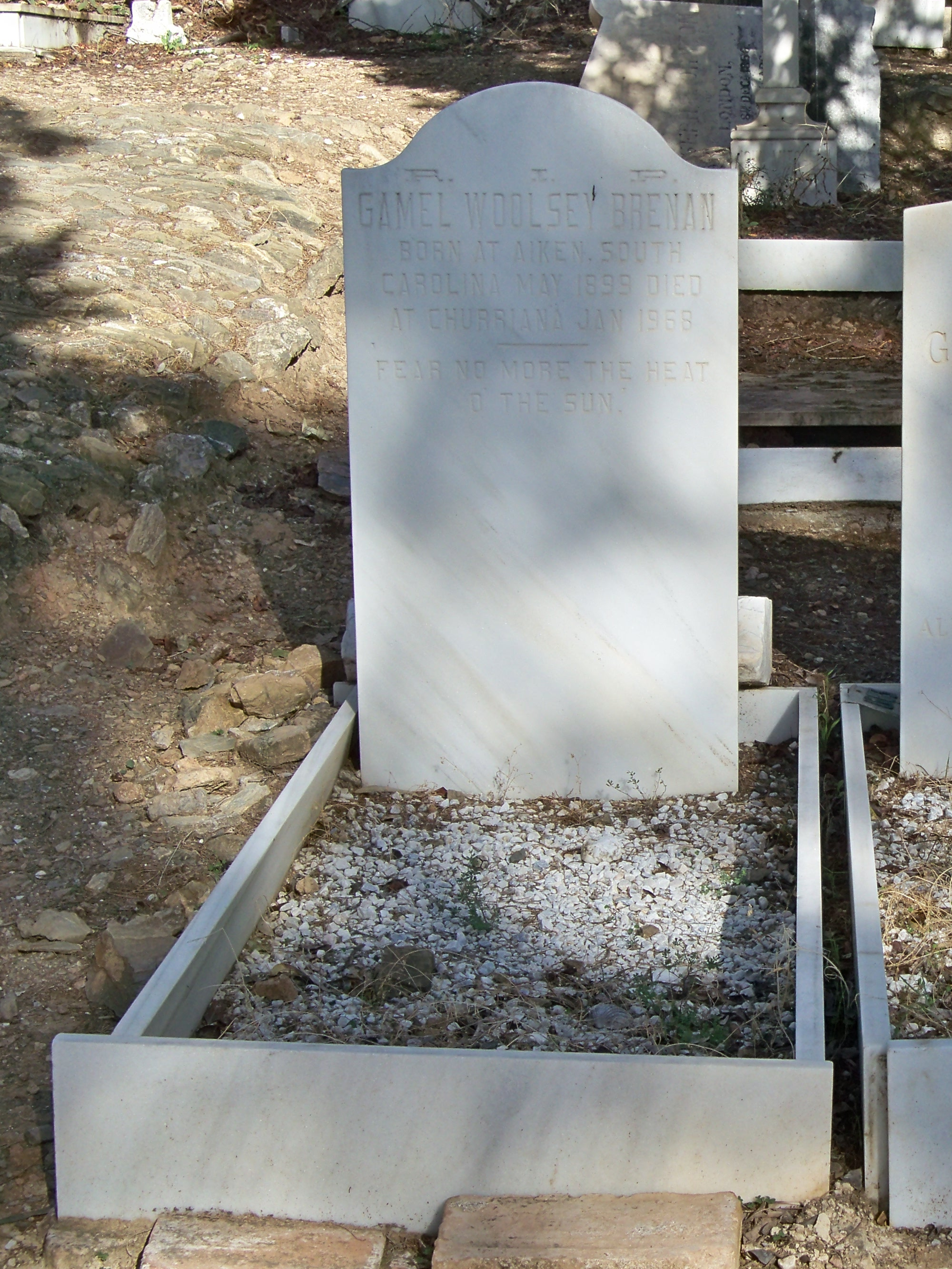
Gamel Woolsey's grave at the English Cemetery in Málaga

One Way of Love, accepted by Gollancz in 1931, but suppressed because it was considered too sexually explicit, was published by Virago Press in 1987. Death's Other Kingdom was re-released as Malaga Burning in 1998 by Pythia Press, and is now available on e-readers and in paperback under its original title. Patterns on the Sand, which recalls Woolsey's South Carolina childhood, was published by The Sundial Press in 2012. Various volumes of poetry, including her Collected Poems, have been published posthumously.

A fuller record of Woolsey's life is contained in the e-reader version of Death's Other Kingdom. Gerald Brenan's account of their life together is published in his Personal Record.

"WHEN I AM DEAD AND LAID AT LAST TO REST"

When I am dead and laid at last to rest,
Let them not bury me in holy ground -
To lie the shipwrecked sailor cast ashore -
But give the corpse to fire, to flood, to air,
The elements that may the flesh transform
To soar with birds, to float where fishes are,
To rise in smoke, shine in a leaping flame -
To be in freedom lost in nothingness,
Not garnered in the grave, hoarded by death.
What is remembrance that we crave for it?
Let me be nothing then, not face nor name;
As on the seagull wings where bright seas pour,
As air that quickens at the opened door:
When I am dead let me be nothing more.

== In popular culture ==
- Sandra Wahlbeck portrays Woolsey in the 2003 Goya Award winning Spanish film Al sur de Granada, written and directed by Fernando Colomo and based on the 1957 autobiographical book South from Granada by Gerald Brenan.
- Nadia de Santiago portrays Woolsey in the 2023 Goya Award nominated Spanish documentary film Caleta Palace, written and directed by José Antonio Hergueta and inspired on her book The Other Kingdom of Death.
