= Inkpen Hill =

Hill in Berkshire, England

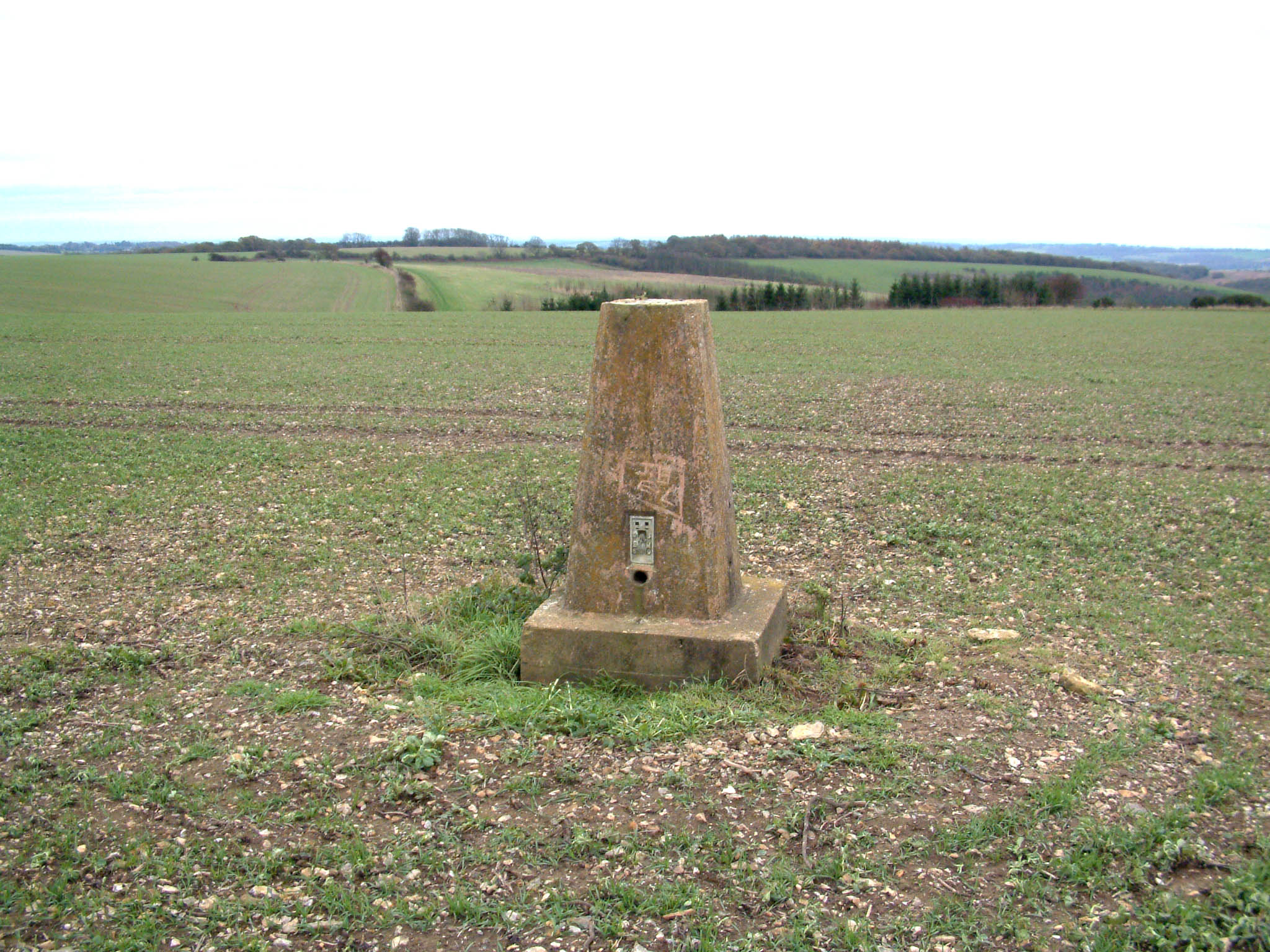
- The triangulation pillar on Inkpen Hill

Highest point
- Elevation: 291 m (955 ft)
- Coordinates: 51.355487°N 1.491251°W

Geography
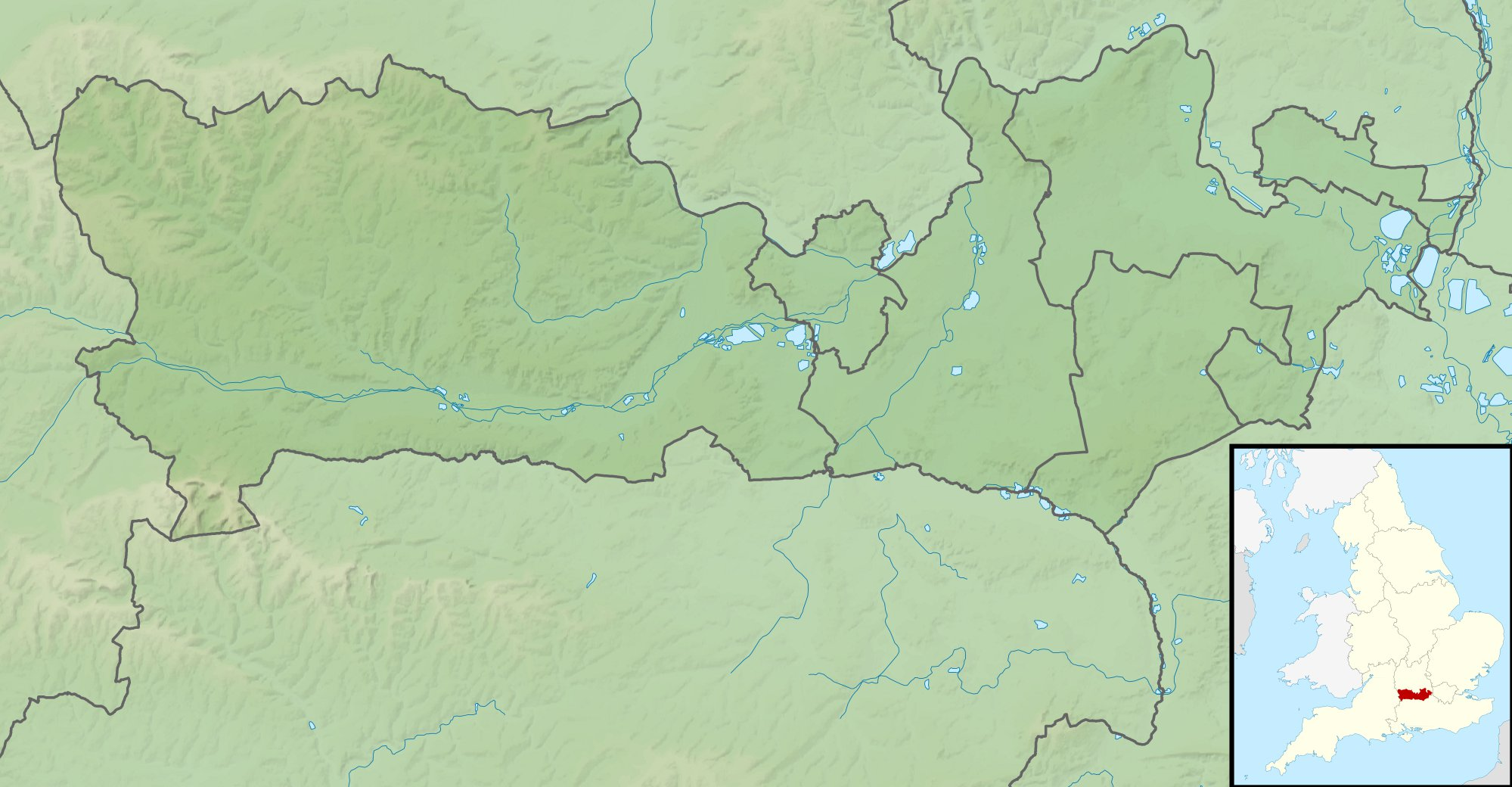
- Location within Berkshire
- Location: Berkshire, England
- Parent range: North Hampshire Downs
- OS grid: SU354620
- Topo map: OS Explorer 158

Inkpen Hill is a summit in Berkshire, England, with a maximum elevation of 291 m (955 ft). The hill is about 7 miles (11 km) southwest of Newbury on the Hampshire/Berkshire border and is part of the north-facing scarp of the North Hampshire Downs, a chalk ridge within the North Wessex Downs Area of Outstanding Natural Beauty. It lies between Walbury Hill, the county top of Berkshire, to the east and Ham Hill to the west. Parts of the hill lie within the Inkpen and Walbury Hills SSSI.

Inkpen Hill is accessible on foot from a car park on a minor road just to the west of Walbury Hill, by a byway that passes by Combe Gibbet before reaching the summit of Inkpen Hill. The Test Way long distance footpath passes along this byway, on its way from Walbury Hill to Eling in Hampshire. A triangulation pillar stands near to the summit of the hill, whilst a dew pond, known as Wigmoreash Pond, lies between the summit and Combe Gibbet.

The hill lies within the civil parishes of Inkpen (which includes the summit), Combe and Buttermere. Inkpen and Combe are both within the unitary authority area of West Berkshire and the ceremonial county of Berkshire, whilst Buttermere is in the unitary authority area and ceremonial county of Wiltshire.
