= Ham Hill, Wiltshire =

Area of chalk downland in Wiltshire, England

Ham Hill
- Site of Special Scientific Interest
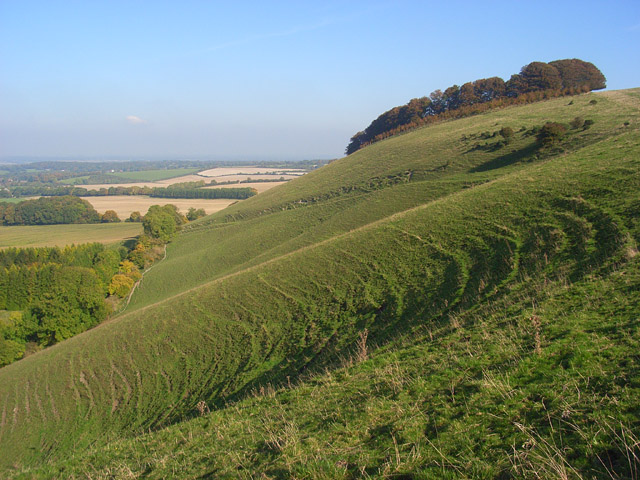

- Location within Wiltshire
- Location of Ham Hill.
- Area of search: Wiltshire South
- Grid reference: SU333617
- Coordinates: 51.3534°N 1.5232°W
- Interest: Biological
- Area: 1.5 ha (3.7 acres)
- Notification date: 1971

Ham Hill is a hill and area of chalk downland in Wiltshire, England, on the steep banks running alongside the road from the village of Ham to Buttermere, close to the Berkshire border. A biological Site of Special Scientific Interest, notified in 1971, covers 1.5 hectares of the site; this designation is due to the site's species-rich plant and insect communities, which include some rare species. Notable among these is the musk orchid (Herminium monorchis), which has been confirmed at only one other site in Wiltshire.

The site is managed as a nature reserve by Wiltshire Wildlife Trust. It is managed by grazing with sheep to prevent scrub encroachment and takeover by rank vegetation, which would otherwise crowd out the scarce plant species.

== Biological interest ==
The hillsides at this site have short, herb-rich grassland, and the flatter areas, taller vegetation. The main species in the plant communities here are upright brome (Bromus erectus), sheep's fescue (Festuca ovina), quaking-grass (Briza media), and downland herbs such as burnet-saxifrage (Pimpinella saxifraga), salad-burnet (Sanguisorba minor), common milkwort (Polygala vulgaris) and dwarf thistle (Cirsium acaule). Other plant species found include squinancywort (Asperula cynanchica).

A wide range of typical chalk downland specialists are found at Ham Hill including clustered bellflower (Campanula glomerata), autumn gentian (gentianella amarella), chalk milkwort (Polygala vulgaris), horseshoe vetch (Hippocrepis comosa) and common rockrose (Helianthemum nummularium). Both clustered bellflower (Campanula glomerata and autumn gentian (gentianella amarella) are abundant.

This is one of only two confirmed sites in Wiltshire for musk orchid (Herminium monorchis). Seven other species of orchids are presented including frog orchid (Coeloglossum viride), burnt orchid (Orchis ustulata) and fragrant orchid (Gymnadenia conopsea).

Chalk-grassland bryophytes found here include the liverwort Leiocolea turbinata and the mosses Ctenidium molluscum, Dicranella varia, Weissia microstoma and Entodon concinnus.

A colony of the Duke of Burgundy butterflies (Hamearis lucina) is present and other butterfly species associated with chalk flora include green hairstreak (Callophrys rubi), dingy skipper (Erynnis tages), dark green fritillary (Argynnis aglaja) and chalkhill blue (Lysandra coridon).

The Roman snail (Helix pomatia), the largest snail species to be found in Britain, occurs here.
