= The Spanish Labyrinth =

1943 book by Gerald Brenan

- First edition
- Author: Gerald Brenan
- Language: English
- Subject: History
- Published: 1943
- Media type: Print

The Spanish Labyrinth (full title: The Spanish Labyrinth: An Account of the Social and Political Background of the Spanish Civil War) by Gerald Brenan, is an account of Spain's social, economic, and political history as the background of the Spanish Civil War.

First published in 1943, it has stayed in print, with repeated reissues. Together with works by noted Hispanists such as Paul Preston, Raymond Carr, Burnett Bolloten, and Hugh Thomas, The Spanish Labyrinth is deemed to be essential background reading for studies of Spain and its history.

The Spanish Labyrinth was banned by the government of Francisco Franco because of its criticism of his regime. A Spanish-language translation of The Spanish Labyrinth, published in Paris by Ruedo Ibérico, was secretly smuggled into the country by anti-Franco travelers, and the book became popular among Spanish dissidents. After Franco's death, the ban was lifted and the book was well received by Spanish historians.

The 1993 edition has an extensive foreword by Raymond Carr, stating that the book was acclaimed "as one of the most brilliant political and social studies in many years" by the Chicago Sunday Tribune, and "the essence of Spain" by the Manchester Guardian. Carr himself called the book "a revelation to my generation," adding, "What is remarkable about Brenan's account of the Second Republic of 1931–6 is the fairness that has enabled it to stand the test of time… [H]is account stands out as surprisingly impartial."
