= Inkpen and Walbury Hills =

Hills in Berkshire, England

- Site of Special Scientific Interest
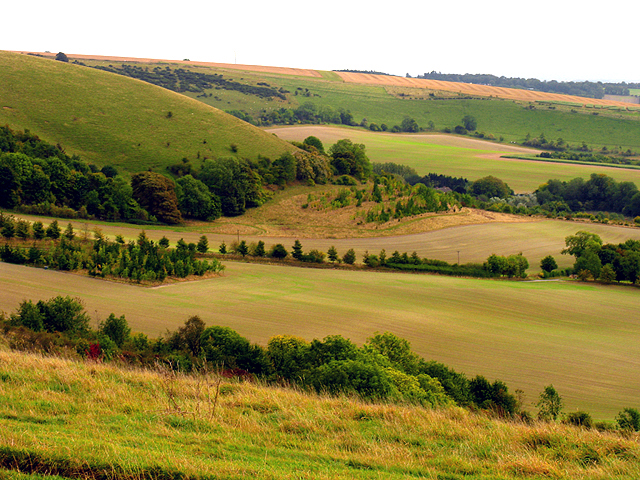
- Walbury Hill

- Location within Berkshire
- Location of Inkpen and Walbury Hills.
- Area of search: Berkshire
- Grid reference: SU 363 621
- Coordinates: 51.357°N 1.480°W
- Interest: Biological
- Area: 86.8 hectares (214 acres)
- Notification date: 1983
- Location map: Magic Map

Inkpen and Walbury Hills is an 86.8-hectare (214-acre) biological Site of Special Scientific Interest south of Kintbury in Berkshire. The site is situated on the flanks of Walbury Hill, the highest point in Berkshire and South East England, and the adjacent Inkpen Hill. A Bronze Age cemetery of three bowl barrows on Inkpen Hill is designated a Scheduled Monument.

These hills have the largest area of unimproved chalk downland in the county and much of it is managed by sheep grazing. North facing slopes have many mosses and herbs, such as hoary plantain and germander speedwell. There are also woods and hedgerows which provide a habitat for many species of breeding birds.
