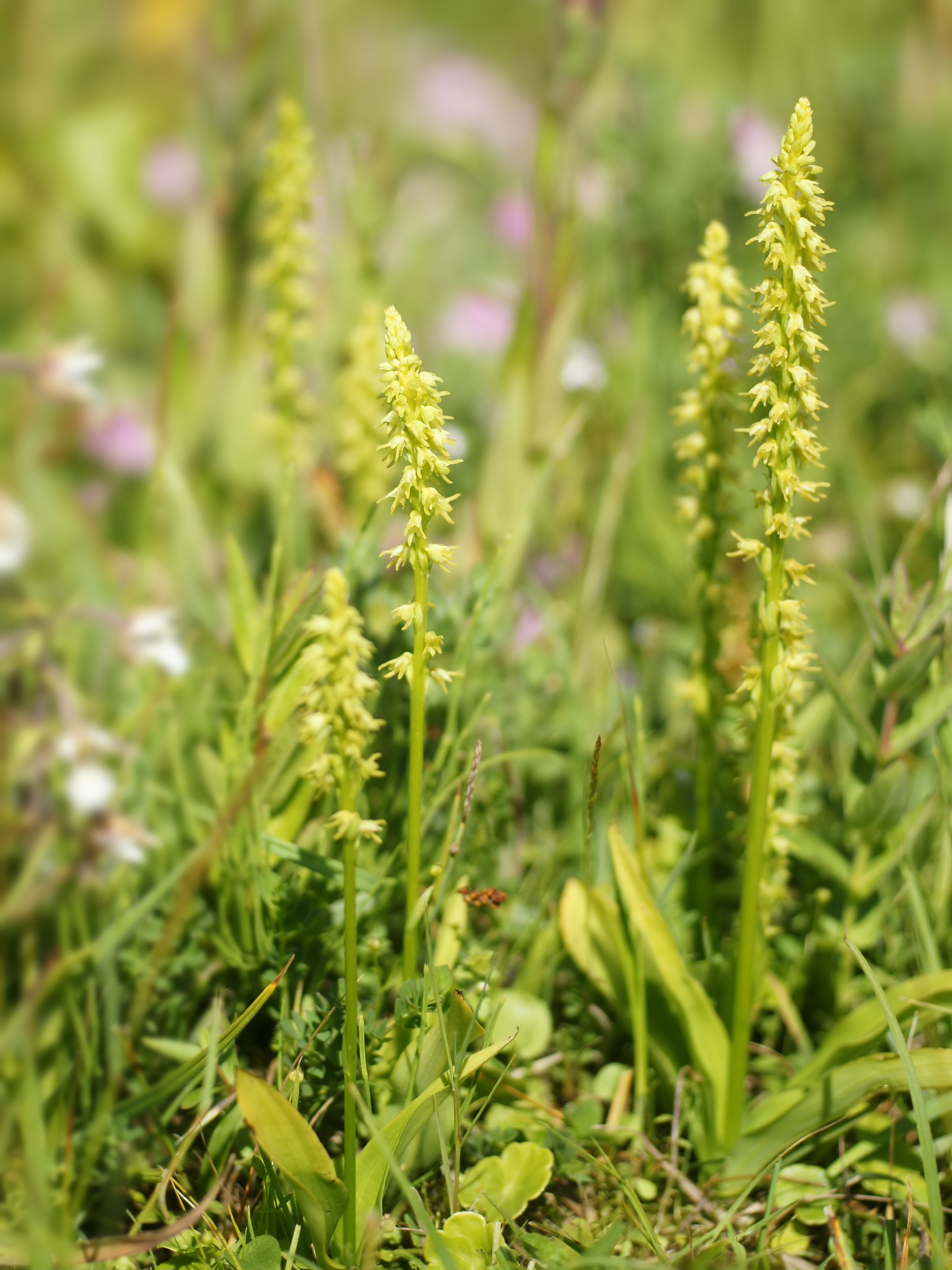

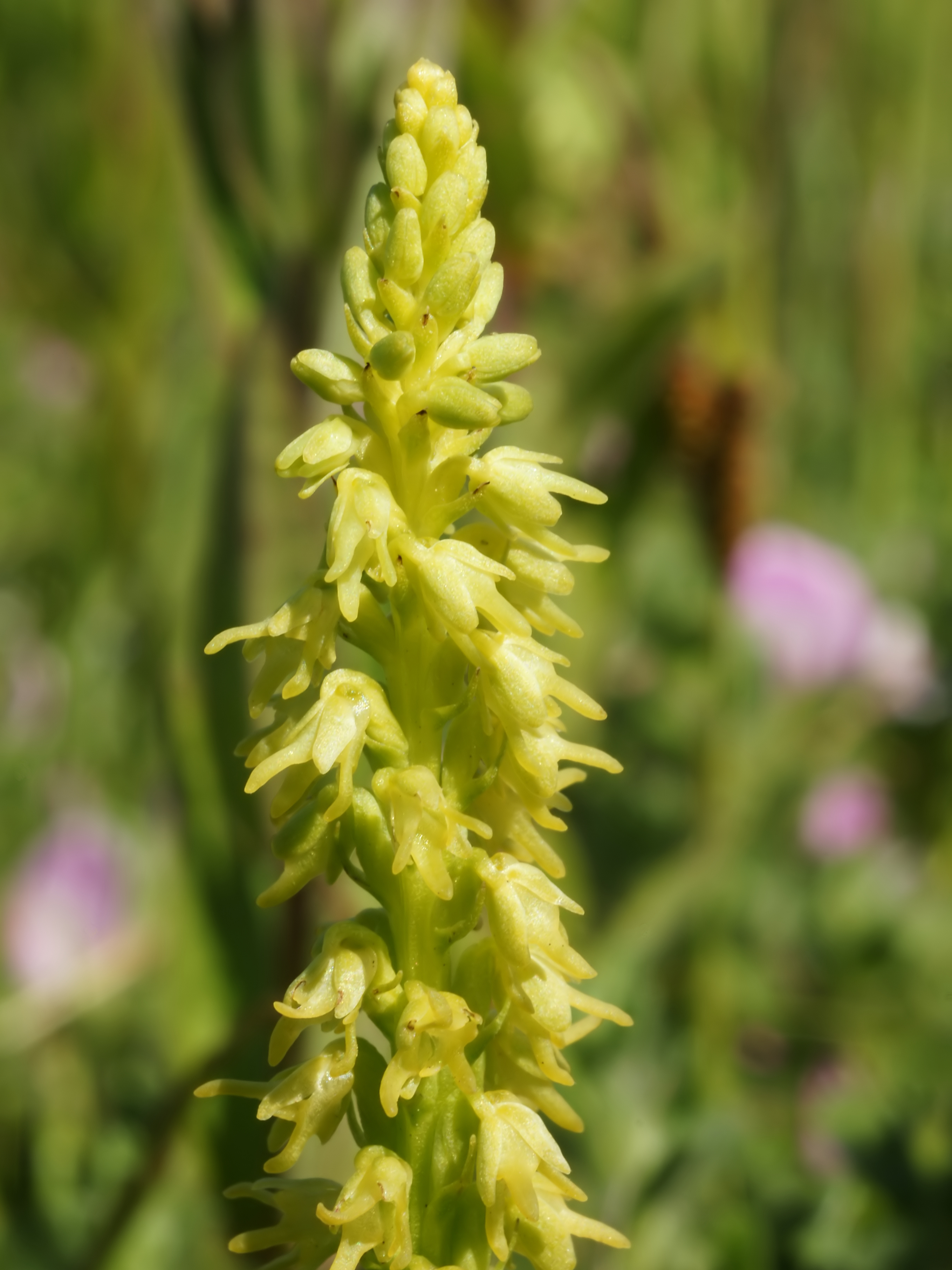

Scientific classification
- Kingdom: Plantae
- Clade: Tracheophytes
- Clade: Angiosperms
- Clade: Monocots
- Order: Asparagales
- Family: Orchidaceae
- Subfamily: Orchidoideae
- Genus: Herminium
- Species: H. monorchis

Binomial name
- Herminium monorchis (L.) R.Br.

Synonyms
- Ophrys monorchis L.; Orchis monorchis (L.) Crantz; Epipactis monorchis (L.) F.W.Schmidt; Arachnites monorchis (L.) Hoffm.; Satyrium monorchis (L.) Pers.; Herminium clandestinum Gren. & Godr.; Monorchis herminium O.Schwarz

= Herminium monorchis =

Species of orchid

Herminium monorchis, the musk orchid, is a commonly occurring species of orchid. It is widespread across much of Europe and northern Asia from France to Japan, including China, Siberia, Mongolia, Ukraine, Germany, Italy, Scandinavia, etc.

It has a localised distribution in Britain; sites where it is found include Ham Hill in Wiltshire and Noar Hill in Hampshire.
