= Ham, Wiltshire =

Village in Wiltshire, England

Coordinates: 51.364°N 1.527°W

Ham
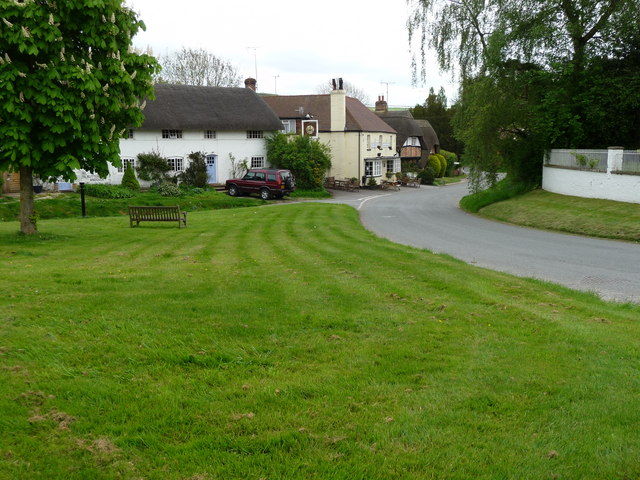
- Village green, Ham, with the Crown and Anchor (2009)

- Location within Wiltshire
- Population: 161 (in 2011)
- OS grid reference: SU330629
- Civil parish: Ham
- Unitary authority: Wiltshire
- Ceremonial county: Wiltshire
- Region: South West
- Country: England
- Sovereign state: United Kingdom
- Post town: Marlborough
- Postcode district: SN8
- Dialling code: 01488
- Police: Wiltshire
- Fire: Dorset and Wiltshire
- Ambulance: South Western
- UK Parliament: East Wiltshire
- Website: www.hamvillage.co.uk

Ham is a small village and civil parish in Wiltshire, England. The parish borders the county of Berkshire, and the village lies about 3 1/4 miles (5.2 km) south of the Berkshire town of Hungerford.

Ham Hill is a biological Site of Special Scientific Interest.

== History ==
Ham is first mentioned in a charter of 931, in which King Æthelstan granted land to his thegn Wulfgar. The modern boundaries of Ham parish are little changed from those defined in clauses attached to the charter. Wulfgar willed the estate to his wife and then to the Old Minster, Winchester.

The Domesday book of 1086 recorded a settlement of twenty households at Hame, on land held by the Bishop of Winchester. In the 13th century, Ham was considered to be part of Savernake Forest. By 1284 the estate was assigned to St. Swithun's Priory, Winchester, and continued to support the monks until the Dissolution. In 1541 it was granted to the chapter of Winchester Cathedral, who retained ownership until the manor and land were sold in the 19th and early 20th centuries.

The Manor House, west of the church, is from the 17th century with changes and additions in the late 18th and 19th. It is a Grade II* listed building. Dove's House, northwest of the village green, is early 18th and also Grade II* listed. Ham Spray House, just east of Ham village at grid reference SU 343 630 is c. 1830. An Ordnance Survey map published in 1961 shows the house and outbuildings standing in parkland; today, large agricultural buildings are immediately north of the house.

A National School was built opposite the Crown and Anchor in 1874, replacing a small schoolroom which was attended by 61 pupils on return day in 1871. The number of children fell during the 20th century but increased on the closure of the Buttermere school in 1944. By 1980 there were only 17 pupils and the school was closed.

== Parish church ==
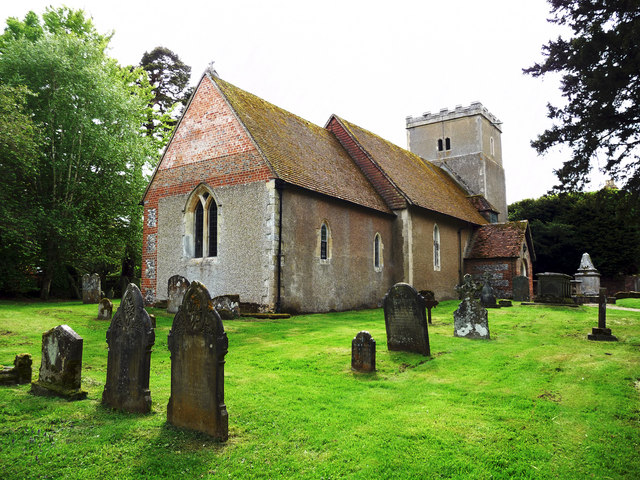
All Saints' Church

A church at Ham was recorded in 1172. The current All Saints' Church dates from the 13th century and has a 14th-century tower. Restoration during the 18th century saw the tower refaced and a north porch added; inside a west gallery was inserted, lit by a dormer window on each side. The interior is largely from the 18th century, the church having escaped Victorian restoration except for minor works in 1849.

The building was designated as Grade I listed in 1986. The benefice was united in 1933 with Buttermere, and in 1956 with Shalbourne. Today the parish forms part of the Savernake team ministry.

== Local government ==
Ham has an elected parish council. It falls within the area of the Wiltshire Council unitary authority which is responsible for almost all aspects of local government.

== Notable people ==
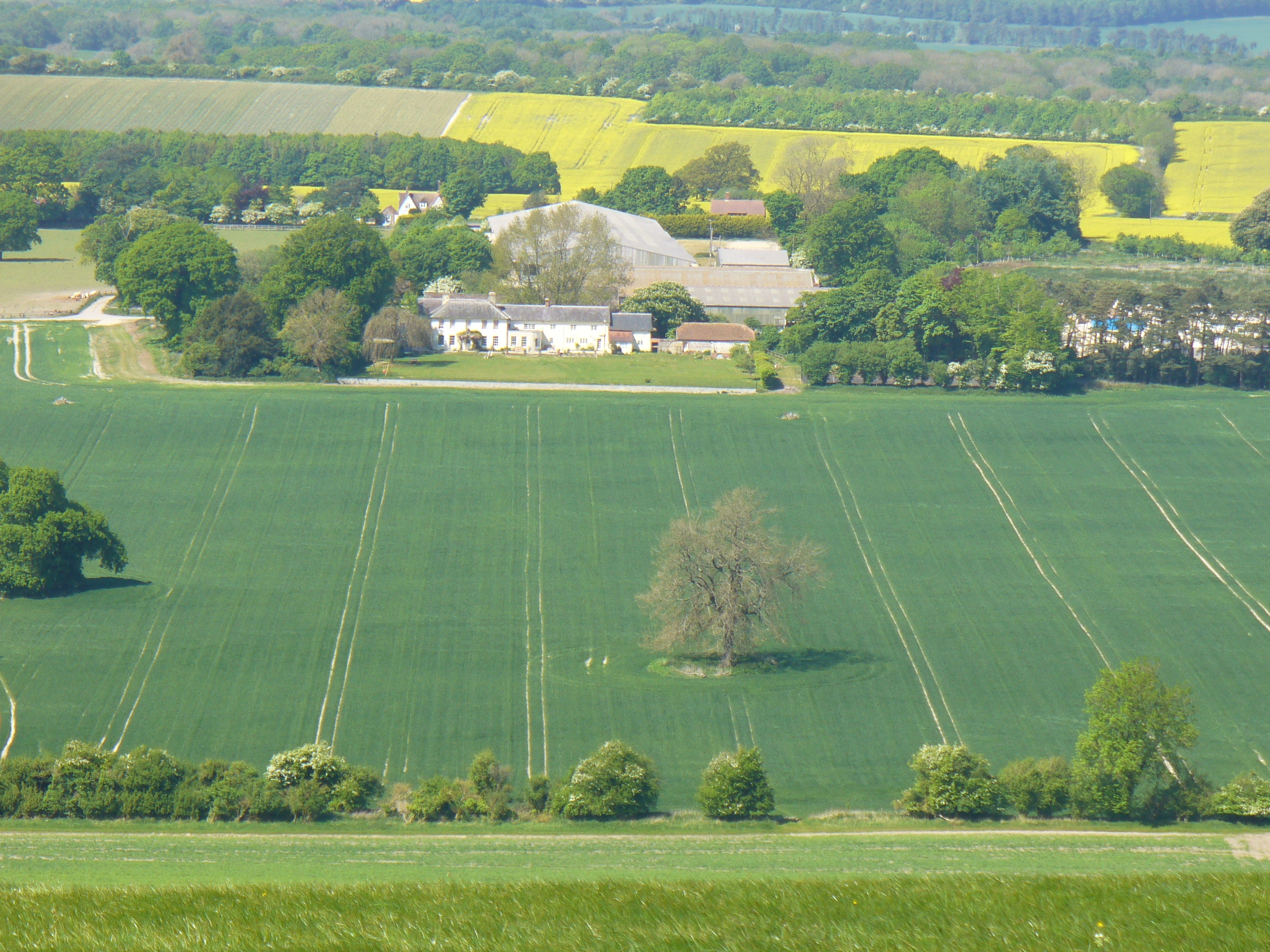
Ham Spray House from Ham Hill

Lytton Strachey and Ralph Partridge, members of the Bloomsbury Group, bought Ham Spray House for £2,300 and moved there in 1924. Several of that group and other writers and artists spent time there until Ralph died in 1960, including:

- Dora Carrington (1893–1932), painter and decorative artist
- Frances Partridge (1900–2004), writer and diarist
- Lytton Strachey (1880–1932), writer and biographer
- Stephen Tomlin (1901–1937), artist
- Henrietta Bingham (1901–1958), American journalist, newspaper executive and horse breeder

== Amenities ==
Ham has a village hall and a pub, the Crown and Anchor.

== See also ==
- Carrington – 1995 biographical film, partly set at Ham Spray House
