= Noel Carrington =

English book designer, editor, and publisher (1895–1989)

- Born: 1895; Hereford, England
- Died: 1989 (aged 93–94)
- Education: Bedford School; Christ Church, Oxford
- Spouse: Catharine Alexander (m. 1925)
- Children: 3
- Relatives: Dora Carrington (sister); Joanna Carrington (daughter)

Noel Lewis Carrington (24 December 1894 – 11 April 1989) was an English book designer, editor, publisher, and the founder of Puffin Books. He was the author of books on design and on recreation and also worked for Oxford University Press and Penguin Books. In the 1920s he went out to India on behalf of OUP to establish a branch office there.

== Biography ==
The son of railway engineer Samuel Carrington and Charlotte (née Houghton), and brother of the artist Dora Carrington, Noel Carrington was born in Hereford in 1895. He was educated at Bedford School and at Christ Church, Oxford. In 1925 Noel Carrington married Catharine Alexander (1904–2004), who had been a student at the Slade School of Fine Art. They had three children, Paul, Joanna and Jane, and lived in Hampstead until soon after 1945 when they moved to Lambourn, Berkshire, to farm at Long Acre. Some of Noel Carrington's correspondence with his sister Dora has been published. He died on 11 April 1989, aged 94.

== Oxford University Press ==
Geoffrey Cumberlege and Noel Carrington replaced E. V. Rieu in the management of the Indian branches of Oxford University Press in 1920. Noel got Dora to illustrate his Stories Retold edition of Don Quixote for the Indian market. Their father, Samuel Carrington, had been a railway engineer in India in the nineteenth century. Noel Carrington's unpublished memoir of his six years in India is in the Oriental and India Office Collections of the British Library. By 1915 there were makeshift depots at Madras and Calcutta. In 1920 Noel Carrington went to Calcutta to set up a proper branch. There he became friendly with Edward Thompson who involved him in the abortive scheme to produce the 'Oxford Book of Bengali Verse'.

== Selected publications ==
- 1933: Broadway and the Cotswolds, ed. by Noel Carrington. Birmingham: Printed & published for the Lygon Arms, Broadway by the Kynoch Press
- 1933: Design in the Home
- 1943 - 1946 Achievement Books. London: Pilot Press
- 1950: Camping by Water; ed. by Noel Carrington and Patricia Cavendish. London: Peter Davies
- 1954: Colour and Pattern in the Home. London: B.T. Batsford. 1954
- 1965: Mark Gertler: Selected Letters, edited by Noel Carrington (London: Rupert Hart-Davis)
- 1978: Carrington: paintings, drawings and decorations. Oxford: Polytechnic Press ISBN 0-902692-14-3; ISBN 0-902692-15-1 (Carrington = Dora Carrington; limited ed. of 1,000 copies; collector's ed. of 100 copies)
