= Rex Hunter =

NZ poet, playwright and fiction writer

Maurice Reginald (Rex) Hunter (5 January 1889 – 18 February 1960) was a New Zealand poet, playwright and fiction writer. He is best known for his work as a journalist in America (New York, Chicago) as well as for his marriage to the South Carolina poet Gamel Woolsey in the 1920s and his friendships with writers Carl Sandburg, Ben Hecht, John Cowper Powys, E. E. Cummings and Llewelyn Powys.

== Life ==
Hunter was born at Southbrook, Canterbury, near Christchurch. His father, Thomas Hunter, was a local storekeeper and a native of Scotland, and Rex was his fourth child. Rex had two brothers: Justice Hunter and Eric Hunter, and one sister. Rex was educated locally in Christchurch and Canterbury district (Waltham School and Darfield High School), then became a pupil teacher at Waltham School and went on to study and pass Civil Service examinations.

He was appointed cadet for Department of Tourist and Health Resorts on 22 May 1908. He left New Zealand for Sydney, in 1909 (after a transfer) working briefly as Shipping Reporter for the Sydney Daily Telegraph and worked in other parts of Australia. He returned to New Zealand in 1912 near when his father died (in March 1914) and worked for several years at The Press (Christchurch) and in Auckland.

Around 1914, his wanderlust took him next to America via Australia, Fiji and Hawaii. In America he roved from San Francisco to Denver, Kansas to Chicago and then on to New York. He also spent time in St Louis, Missouri, as a scenario writer for motion pictures. In Chicago around 1918, he worked on the Daily News with Carl Sandburg and Ben Hecht. He also had plays produced: Stuff O' Dreams at the Kansas City Music Hall, 19 April 1918 and The Romany Road and The Wild Goose at Chicago's Central Music Hall, 15 February 1919 and 26 April 1919 respectively.

After arriving in New York in the early 1920s, he met and married (on 2 April 1923) the poet and writer Gamel Woolsey and became part of the Greenwich Village literary circle that included John Cowper Powys and Llewelyn Powys. He also did some acting in these years with Woolsey at Woodstock. In 1927, he and Woolsey visited England.

Woolsey then separated from him after four years of marriage (her posthumous 1987 novel One Way of Love is said to be a semi-autobiographical account of their marriage), although they never divorced.

He continued to live in Greenwich Village and became a lead writer for The Sun. He wrote articles for this paper on his wanderings in Britain from John O'Groats to Land's End and the boulevards of Paris. He kept working as a freelance journalist until 1949 when he returned to Christchurch, New Zealand, where his brothers lived. At some point in New York, he became a neighbour of the poet E. E. Cummings.

Returning to New Zealand, his brother found him work at the Timaru Herald. Hunter was living in Timaru at the time of his death in Dunedin in February 1960. After cremation, his ashes were interred at Christchurch.

== Literary output ==
Rex Hunter published five books in his lifetime, all in America: Stuff O' Dreams (1919), a book of four one-act plays; And Tomorrow Comes (1924), a collection of poetry; The Saga of Sinclair (1927), an autobiographical narrative poem; Porlock: A Portrait (1940), a novel; and Call Out of Darkness (1946), a final collection of poetry.

In Australia, he wrote words for a song When the Wattle Blooms Again with music composed by Nellie Kolle, published in Melbourne. Some of his uncollected poetry was published in an unnamed Australian theatre weekly c.1909–11. Stuff O' Dreams was reviewed by New Zealand Truth (18 September 1920) and described as a 'perfect jewel'. In 1930, he was included as a poet in the article, 'Literature in New Zealand', by W. S. Dale for the February issue of The Bookman.

His most successful publication is the novel Porlock about a Greenwich Village character, Pearson, was well reviewed and well received in America.

Hunter maintained literary ties with New Zealand through Noel Hoggard's handprinted Pukerua Bay magazine, Arena. From New York, Hunter published a poem in Arena 17 (1947) and (back in New Zealand) two poems by Hunter appeared in Arena 31 (1951). Arena printed an obituary for him in No. 53 (Autumn 1960) describing Hunter as 'an Arena subscriber of many years' standing'.

After Hunter's death, Gamel Woolsey scholar and editor, Kenneth Hopkins, reprinted two of his books, The Saga of Sinclair (1981) and And Tomorrow Comes (1982). Hopkins also wrote a biographical booklet on Hunter, Passages in the Life of Reginald Hunter (1985), after visiting Wellington, New Zealand, to study Hunter's papers in the Alexander Turnbull Library. There is an entry for Hunter in the Oxford Companion to New Zealand Literature (1998).

In 2010 and 2011, Hunter's Stuff O' Dreams was republished in America in various editions from digital files of the original 1919 text.

Hunter's papers are held in the Alexander Turnbull Library, Wellington. There is an unpublished autobiography, 'Odyssey of an Antipodean' [c.1950], in the Turnbull and there is an unpublished novel The Gull (though not held by the Turnbull).
