= John Hope-Johnstone (photographer) =

Charles John Hope-Johnstone (1883–1970) was a British photographer and a member or associate of the Bloomsbury Group. He was the editor of the Burlington Magazine from 1919 to 1920, and tutored the children of Augustus John. He had walked to Bosnia with Gerald Brenan before World War I, and introduced the latter to the Bloomsbury Group in 1919. For many years, until his death, he lived in a tiny cottage attached to Gerald Brenan's house in Aldbourne, Wiltshire.

Anthony Powell, in his memoirs, describes Hope-Johnstone's status as "not 'of Bloomsbury' in anything like the strictest sense", but "accepted in Bloomsbury circles as an equal".
