= Leiocolea turbinata =

Scientific classification
- Kingdom: Plantae
- Division: Marchantiophyta
- Class: Jungermanniopsida
- Order: Jungermanniales
- Family: Jungermanniaceae
- Genus: Leiocolea
- Species: L. turbinata

Binomial name
- Leiocolea turbinata Raddi) H.Buch

Species of moss

Leiocolea turbinata is a species of liverwort belonging to the family Jungermanniaceae.

Synonym:

- Jungermannia turbinata Raddi
