= Buttermere, Wiltshire =

Coordinates: 51.347°N 1.511°W

Buttermere
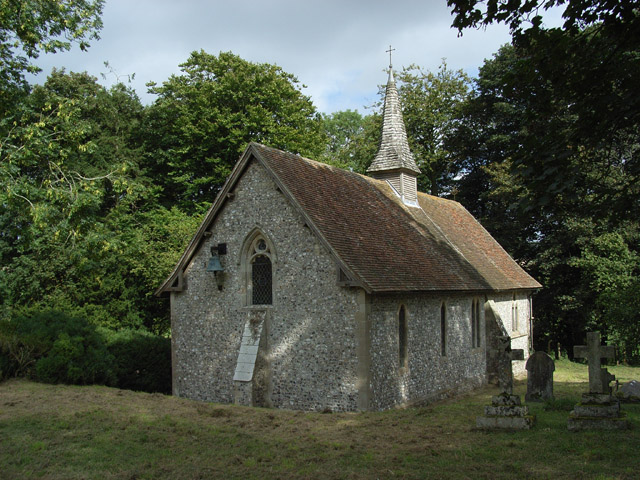
- Church of St James

- Location within Wiltshire
- Population: 49 (in 2011)
- OS grid reference: SU342610
- Civil parish: Buttermere
- Unitary authority: Wiltshire
- Ceremonial county: Wiltshire
- Region: South West
- Country: England
- Sovereign state: United Kingdom
- Post town: Marlborough
- Postcode district: SN8
- Dialling code: 01488
- Police: Wiltshire
- Fire: Dorset and Wiltshire
- Ambulance: South Western
- UK Parliament: East Wiltshire

Buttermere is a small village and civil parish on the eastern boundary of Wiltshire, England, about 4.5 miles (7 km) south of Hungerford and 10 miles (16 km) southeast of Marlborough. The village stands above the steep escarpment of Ham Hill, and at 257 metres (843 ft) above sea level it is the highest village in Wiltshire and probably the highest in Wessex.

The parish includes the hamlet of Henley, southwest of Buttermere village and next to the county border with Hampshire, and the western flanks of Inkpen Hill.

== Toponymy ==
A settlement at Buttermere is recorded in the 930s as Butermere, and as Butremare in Domesday Book. The name is thought to derive from Old English: butere + mere and is generally agreed to mean "lake with good pasture".

== History ==
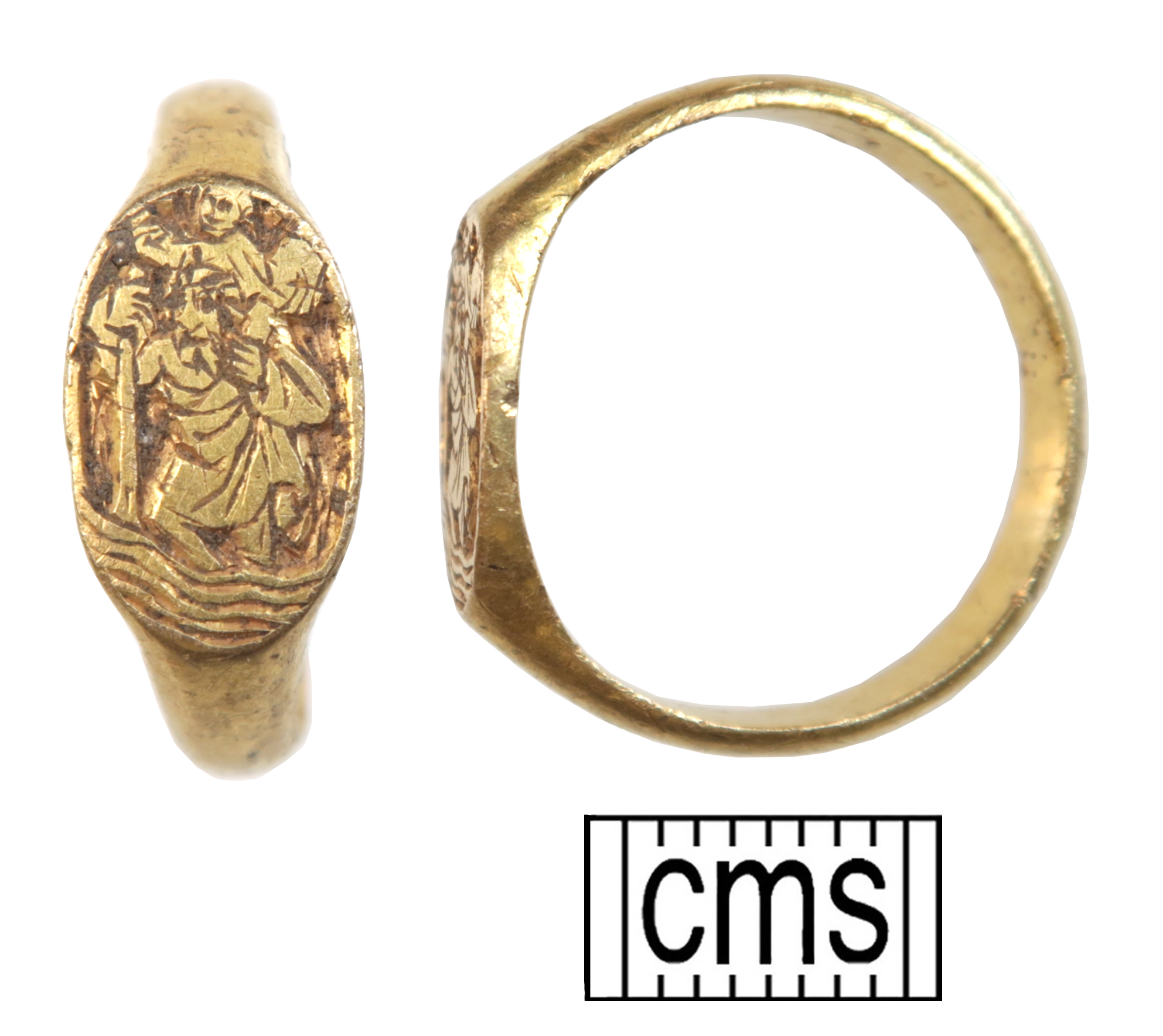
A late-Medieval finger ring c. 1400 – c. 1500, engraved with a depiction of St Christopher carrying the Christ Child, found in Buttermere in 2019

The manor of Buttermere was recorded in the 9th century, and from the 11th was held by St Swithun's priory, Winchester. Henley's land was probably added to the parish in the 11th century, when it was also held by St Swithun's. The parish was part of Savernake forest until 1330.

The population of the parish was steady at around 130 for the whole of the 19th century but declined in the 20th, reaching 39 in 1971.

A small school was built near the rectory in 1872, and closed in 1944 when there were only nine pupils.

== Parish church ==
The Church of England parish church of St James is one of the smallest in Wiltshire. There was a church here in the 13th century, and a watercolour by John Buckler in 1806 shows a simple building with a wooden west turret. In 1855-6 the church was rebuilt on the same footprint, using salvaged materials, with a small central spire.

The church is in the parish of Ham and Buttermere, which is part of the Savernake team ministry.

== Local government ==
Buttermere civil parish is governed by a parish meeting, a form of governance applied to parishes with a small population. It is in the area of Wiltshire Council unitary authority, which is responsible for all significant local government functions.
