= Yegen =

Coordinates: 36°59′N 3°07′W

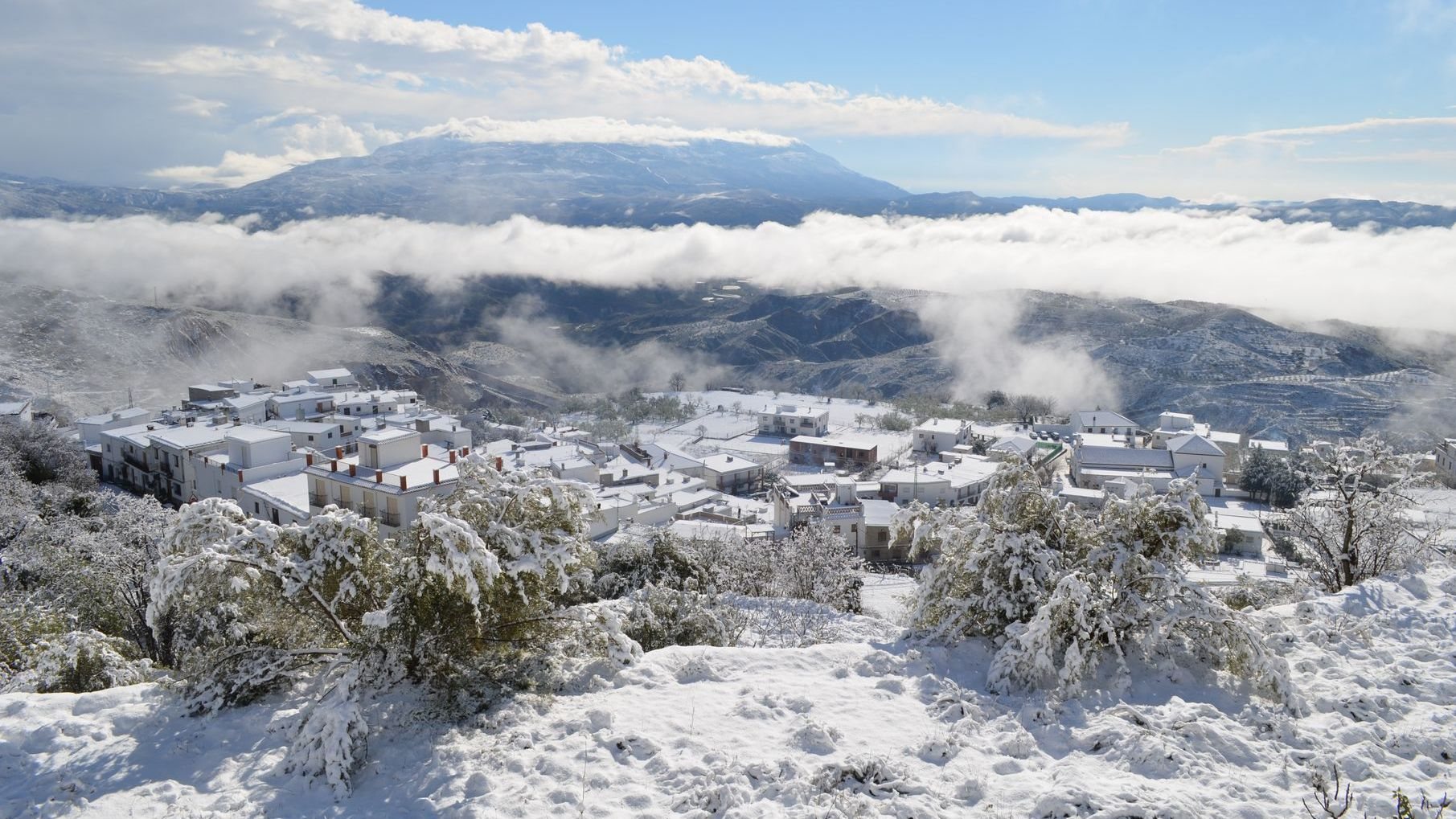
Yegen in snow

Yegen (Spanish: [ˈɟ͡ʝexen]) is a village of the municipality of Alpujarra de la Sierra in the province of Granada.

The village was the home of the British writer Gerald Brenan in the 1920s, and he described its customs in South from Granada, one of his best-known books. Brenan stated in the book that he chose Yegen (at the time with no paved road connection or public transport) because of its favourable geography, including abundant water. In recent years the village has held events commemorating the writer's interest in local culture. A Brenan museum is being developed in the village.

== History ==
Most of its inhabitants are descendants of people from the northern regions of Spain (mostly from Galicia) that were brought to the village after the Expulsion of the Moriscos in the 17th century.

At the end of the 19th century and all across the 20th century, Yegen, like most of the country, was a land of emigrants that left for better opportunities in Europe (Andorra, Germany, Switzerland) and America. This situation reversed in the late 1980s and now there is a small community with a few British and other European citizens that have bought houses in Yegen as a first or second residence.
