= Angus Mackay (historian) =

British historian

Angus Mackay (1939–2016) was a Scottish historian and Hispanist, specialising in Later Medieval Spain.

Having spent four years as a lecturer in history at the University of Reading, most of his career was at the University of Edinburgh, where he was awarded a PhD in 1970 for his thesis, Economy and society in Castile in the Fifteenth Century. He became Professor of Medieval History there in 1986, taking over the chair from his mentor, Denys Hay.

Mackay is considered, together with Raymond Carr and John Elliott, a major figure in developing Spanish historiography.

== Publications ==
- Love, religion, and politics in fifteenth century Spain by Ian Macpherson and Angus MacKay. Leiden; Boston: Brill, 1998. ISBN 90-04-10810-6
- Atlas of medieval Europe edited by Angus Mackay with David Ditchburn. London; New York: Routledge, 1997. ISBN 0-415-12231-7
- The Spanish world: civilization and empire, Europe and the Americas, past and present edited by J.H. Elliott; texts by Angus MacKay… [ET to.]. New York: H.N.Abrams, 1991. ISBN 0-8109-3409-4
- The Hispanic world; civilization and empire: Europe and the Americas: past and present edited by J.H. Elliott; texts by Angus Mackay… [ET to.]. London: Thames and the Hudson, c1991.
- The Hispanic world: civilization and empire: Europe and America: past and present J.H. Elliott, ed.; Angus Mackay… [ET to.]. Barcelona: Critic, c1991.
- The impact of humanism on Western Europe edited by Anthony Goodman and Angus MacKay. London; New York: Longman, 1990 (1993 printing) ISBN 0-582-50331-0
- Medieval one frontier societies edited by Robert Bartlett and Angus MacKay. Oxford [England]: Clarendon Press; New York: Oxford University Press, 1989 ISBN 0-19-822881-3
- Society, economy, and religion in annoys medieval Castile Angus MacKay. London: Variorum Reprints, 1987. ISBN 0-86078-209-3
- Things removed from the History of king Don Juan the Second (BL MS Egerton 1875) edited by Angus MacKay and Dorothy Sherman Severin. [Exeter]: University of Exeter, 1981.
- Money, prices, and politics in fifteenth-century Castile Angus MacKay.London: Royal Historical Society, 1981. ISBN 0-901050-82-2
- Spain in the Middle Ages: from to frontier to empire, 1000–1500 Angus MacKay. New York: St. Martin's Press, 1977. ISBN 0-333-12817-6
