= Dora Carrington =

British painter and decorative artist (1893–1932)

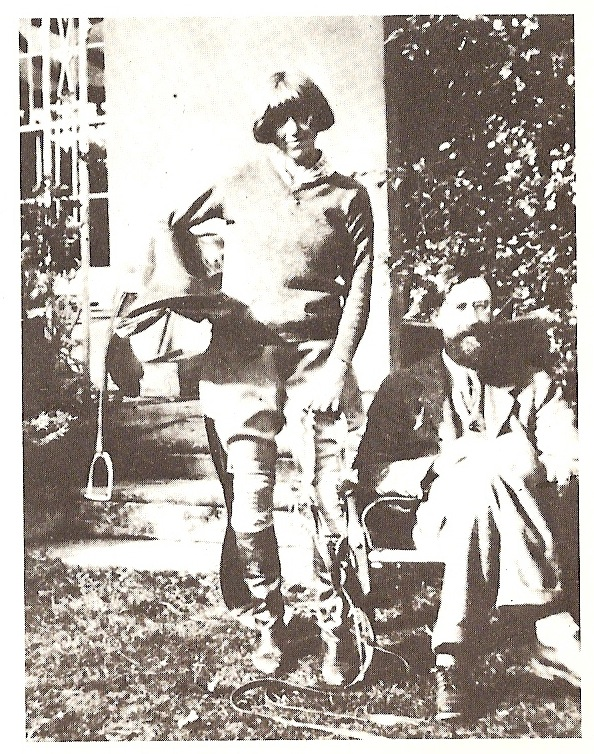
- Carrington with Lytton Strachey
- Born: Dora de Houghton Carrington; 29 March 1893; Hereford, England
- Died: 11 March 1932 (aged 38); Newbury, Berkshire, England
- Education: Slade School of Art; University College London
- Occupations: Painter and decorative artist

Dora de Houghton Carrington (29 March 1893 – 11 March 1932), known generally as Carrington, was an English painter and decorative artist, remembered in part for her association with members of the Bloomsbury Group, especially the writer Lytton Strachey. From her time as an art student, she was known simply by her surname as she considered Dora to be "vulgar and sentimental". She was not well known as a painter during her lifetime, as she rarely exhibited and did not sign her work. She worked for a while at the Omega Workshops, and for the Hogarth Press, designing woodcuts.

== Early life ==
Carrington was born in Hereford, England, to railway engineer Samuel Carrington, who worked for the East India Company, and Charlotte (née Houghton). They had married in 1888 and had five children together of whom Dora was their fourth. She attended the all-girls' Bedford High School, which emphasized art, and her parents paid for her to receive extra lessons in drawing. She won a number of awards in the national school competitions organised by the Royal Drawing Society.

In 1910, she went to the Slade School of Art in central London where she subsequently won a scholarship and several other prizes; her fellow students included Dorothy Brett, Paul Nash, C. R. W. Nevinson and Mark Gertler. All at one time or another were in love with her, as was Nash's younger brother John Nash, who hoped to marry her. Gertler pursued Carrington for a number of years, and they had a brief sexual relationship during the years of the First World War.

During 1912, Carrington attended a series of lectures by Mary Sargant Florence on fresco painting. The following year, she and Constance Lane completed three large frescoes for a library at Ashridge in the Chilterns. Plans, with John and Paul Nash, for a cycle of frescoes for a church in Uxbridge near London came to nothing with the start of the War. After graduating from the Slade, although short of money, Carrington stayed in London, living in Soho with a studio in Chelsea. Her paintings were included in a number of group exhibitions, including with the New English Art Club, and she stopped signing and dating her work. In 1914, Carrington's parents moved to Ibthorpe House in the village of Hurstbourne Tarrant in Hampshire, and shortly afterwards she moved there and set up her studio in an outbuilding.

== Career and personal life ==
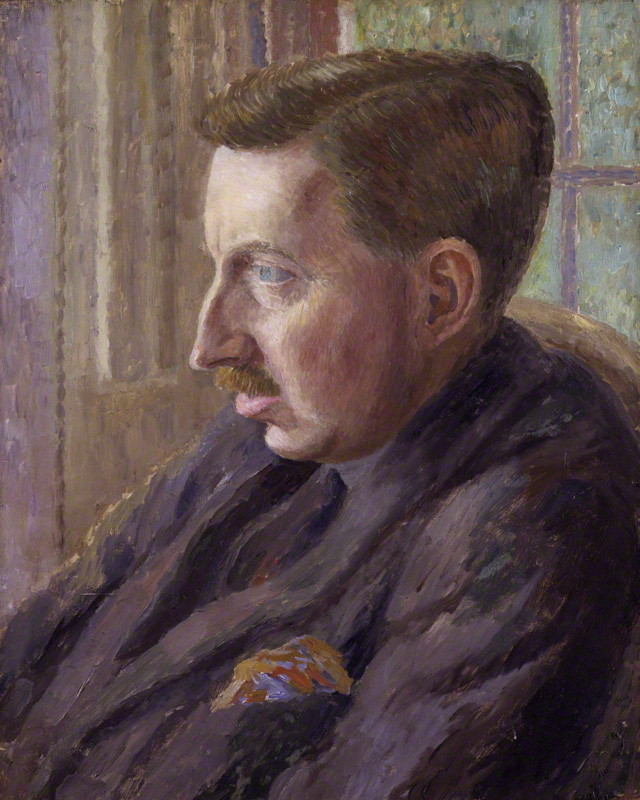
Carrington's portrait of E. M. Forster, 1924–25

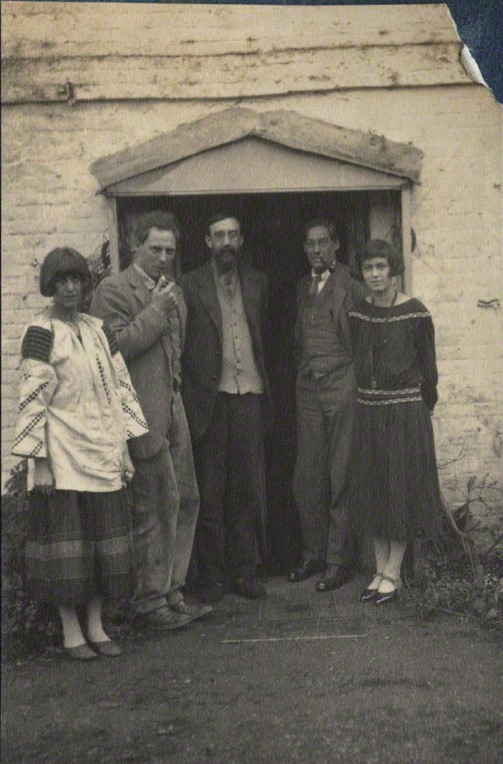
Dora Carrington; Ralph Partridge; Lytton Strachey; Oliver Strachey; Frances Partridge (née Marshall), 1923.

Carrington was not a member of the Bloomsbury Group, though she was closely associated with Bloomsbury and, more generally, with "Bohemian" attitudes, through her long relationship with the homosexual writer Lytton Strachey, whom she first met in 1916. Distinguished by her cropped pageboy hair style (before it was fashionable) and somewhat androgynous appearance, she was troubled by her sexuality; she is believed by some to have had an affair with Henrietta Bingham. She also had a romantic relationship with the writer Gerald Brenan.

In June 1918, Virginia Woolf wrote of Carrington in her diary: "She is odd from her mixture of impulse & self consciousness. I wonder sometimes what she's at: so eager to please, conciliatory, restless, & active.... [B]ut she is such a bustling eager creature, so red & solid, & at the same time inquisitive, that one can't help liking her." Carrington first lived with Lytton Strachey in November 1917, when they moved together to Tidmarsh Mill House, near Pangbourne, Berkshire. Carrington met Ralph Partridge, an Oxford friend of her younger brother Noel, in 1918. Partridge fell in love with Carrington and eventually, in 1921, Carrington agreed to marry him, not for love but to hold the ménage à trois together. Strachey paid for the wedding, and accompanied the couple on their honeymoon in Venice. The three moved to Ham Spray House in Wiltshire in 1924; the house had been purchased by Strachey in the name of Partridge.

In 1926, Partridge began an affair with Frances Marshall, and left to live with her in London. His marriage to Carrington was effectively over, but he continued to visit her most weekends. In 1928, Carrington met Bernard Penrose, a friend of Partridge and the younger brother of the artist Roland Penrose, and they began an affair and also collaborated on the making of three films. Penrose wanted Carrington exclusively for himself, but that was a commitment she refused to make because of her love for Strachey. The affair ended when Carrington became pregnant and had an abortion.

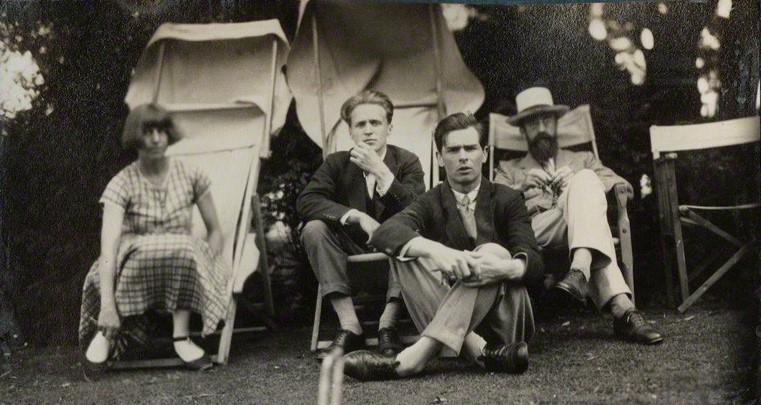
Dora Carrington; Stephen Tomlin; W. J. H. ('Sebastian') Sprott; Lytton Strachey, June 1926

During her lifetime, Carrington's work received no critical attention. Her work can be described as progressive and did not fit into the mainstream of art in England at the time. Part of her works included Victorian-style pictures which were made from coloured tinfoil and paper. Carrington included pen sketches in letters to her friends. She also created woodblock prints, which were highly regarded. Her lesser-known work included painted pub signs and murals, ceramics, fireplaces, and tin trunks.

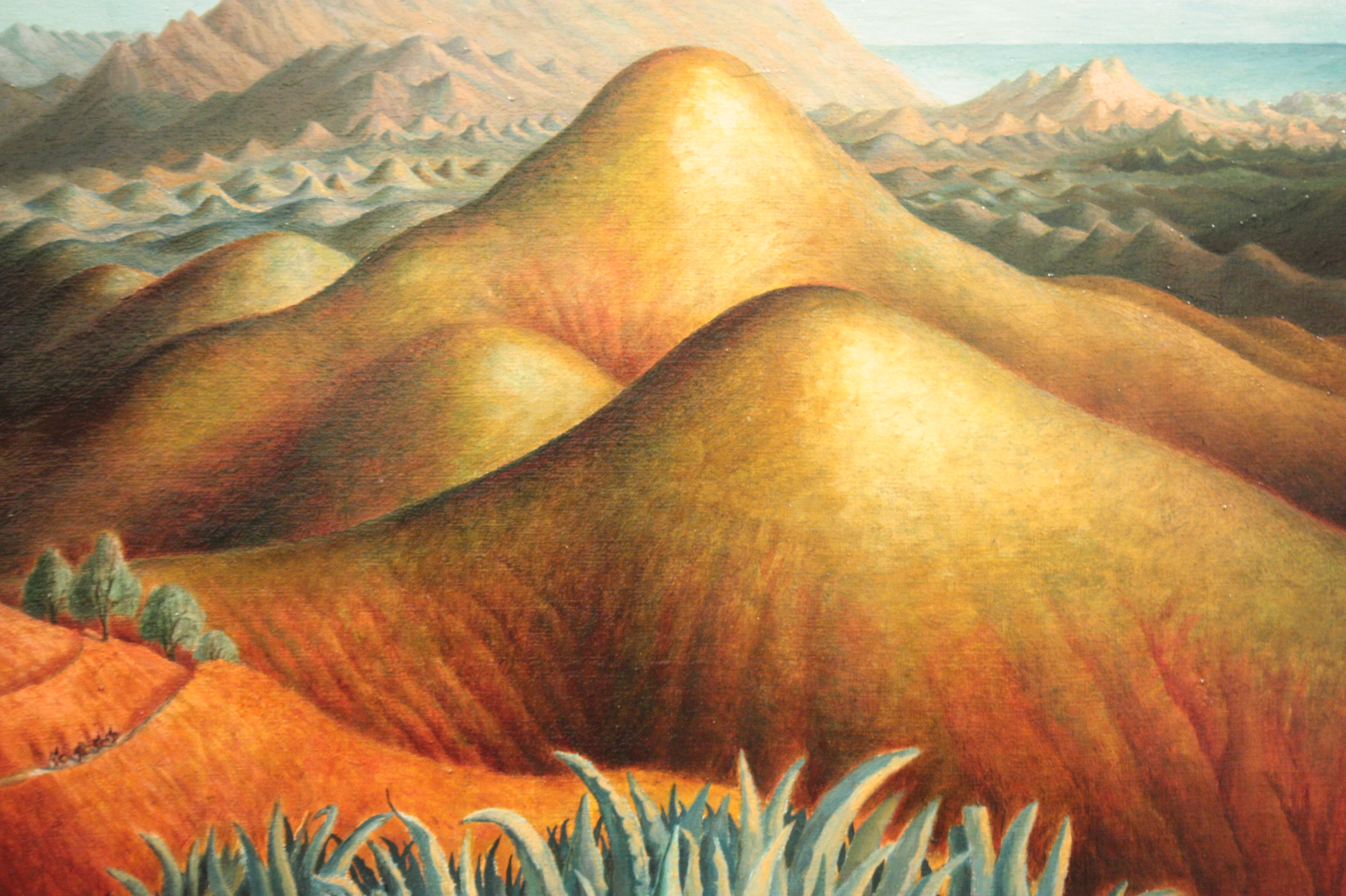
Mountain Ranges from Yegen, Andalusia, 1924, by Dora Carrington

Carrington was better known for her landscape paintings, which have been linked to surrealism. Her landscapes blend the facts of visual perception with interior desires and fantasies. One work of art, Mountain Ranges from Yegen, Andalusia, 1924, shows the split in perspectives. There is an intimate foreground, and there is in the distance a view of the mountains. The main focus, on the middle mountains, exhibit the texture of human skin. This merges the notion of the personal being made public.

=== Relationship with Lytton Strachey ===
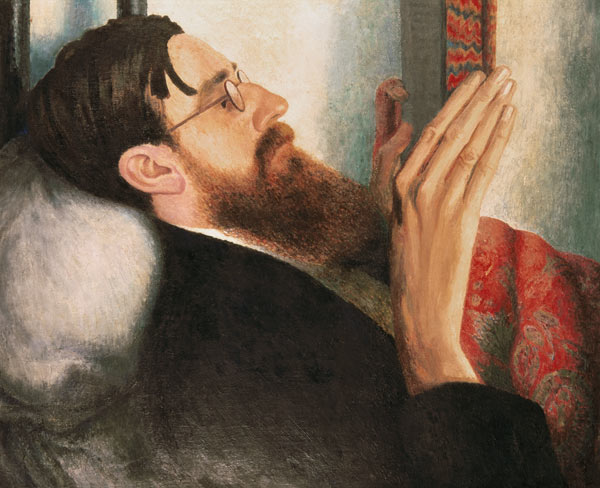
Carrington's portrait of Strachey, 1916

For many years, Carrington's art was neglected by the public, and her main claim to fame was her relationship with Lytton Strachey. On the day that she agreed to marry Partridge she wrote to Strachey, who was in Italy, what has been described as "one of the most moving love letters in the English language". She wrote, "I cried last night, Lytton, whilst he slept by my side sleeping happily—I cried to think of a savage cynical fate which had made it impossible for my love ever to be used by you...." Strachey wrote back, "you do know very well that I love you as something more than a friend, you angelic creature, whose goodness to me has made me happy for years, and whose presence in my life has been and always will be, one of the most important things in my life...." On his deathbed, Strachey said: "I always wanted to marry Carrington and I never did." His biographer calls that sentiment "not true; but he could not have said anything more deeply consoling". Upon his death, Strachey left Carrington £10,000 (roughly the equivalent of £576,000 in 2023).

== Death ==
Dora Carrington died by suicide on 11 March 1932, two months after Strachey's death, using a gun borrowed from her friend, Bryan Guinness. Her body was cremated and the ashes buried under the laurels in the garden of Ham Spray House.

== Legacy ==
An accomplished painter of portraits, landscape and still-life, Carrington also worked in applied and decorative arts, painting on any type of surface she had at hand, including inn signs, tiles and furniture. She also decorated pottery and designed the library at Ham Spray. In 1970, David Garnett published a selection of letters and extracts from her diary, since which time critical and popular appreciation of her work has risen sharply. In 1978, Sir John Rothenstein, for nearly thirty years Director of the Tate Gallery, London, called Dora Carrington "the most neglected serious painter of her time."

Carrington was one of the five artists featured in the television series Five Women Painters made in 1989 by the Arts Council and Channel 4, with accompanying book published by Lennard.

In 1995, she was the subject of a major retrospective exhibition at the Barbican Art Gallery in London and in 2024–2025 there was another retrospective at the Pallant House Gallery in Chichester, co-curated by Anne Chisholm and Ariane Banks. Two of her works are in the Tate Gallery.

== In popular culture ==
=== Books ===
- Diana Mitford, a close friend, profiles Carrington in Loved Ones (1985).
- Gerald Brenan writes about Carrington's visit to him in Spain in his 1957 autobiographical work South from Granada.
- In his first novel Crome Yellow, Aldous Huxley based the character of Mary Bracegirdle on Carrington, and described how she and he slept on the roof of "Lollipop Hall", based on Lady Ottoline Morrell's home. He chose the name "Bracegirdle" because of Dora's chastity.
- Carrington is the inspiration for the character Elinor Brooke in Pat Barker's trilogy of novels, Life Class (2008), Toby's Room (2013) and Noonday (2016).

=== Radio ===
- Carrington was portrayed as "Barrington" by Morwenna Banks in Gloomsbury by Sue Limb, a five-part series parodying the Bloomsbury Group on BBC Radio 4, 2012–2018.

=== Films ===
- Emma Thompson portrays Carrington in the 1995 British biographical film Carrington, written and directed by Christopher Hampton based on the book Lytton Strachey by Michael Holroyd.
- Jessica Kate Meyer portrays Carrington in the 2003 Goya Award-winning Spanish film Al sur de Granada, written and directed by Fernando Colomo, based on the 1957 autobiographical book South from Granada by Gerald Brenan.
