= Gerald Brenan =

British writer and hispanist

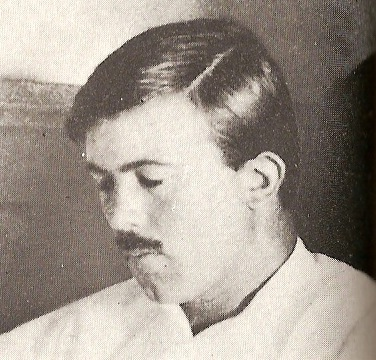
- Born: Edward FitzGerald Brenan; 7 April 1894; Sliema, British Malta
- Died: 19 January 1987 (aged 92); Alhaurin el Grande, Málaga, Spain
- Occupations: Author, historian

Edward FitzGerald Brenan, CBE, MC (7 April 1894 – 19 January 1987) was a British writer and hispanist who spent much of his life in Spain.

Brenan is probably best known for The Spanish Labyrinth, a historical work on the background to the Spanish Civil War, and for a mainly autobiographical work South from Granada: Seven Years in an Andalusian Village. He was appointed CBE in the Diplomatic Service and Overseas List of 1982.

== Life ==
Brenan was born in Malta into a well-off Anglo-Irish family, while his father was serving there in the British Army. He was educated at Radley, a boarding school in England, which he hated due to the bullying he endured.

His autobiographical works make it clear that he did not enjoy a good relationship with his father, Major Hugh Brenan. At the age of 18, and to spite his father who wanted him to train for an army career at the Royal Military College, Sandhurst, he set off with an older friend, the occasional photographer and eccentric, John Hope-Johnstone, to walk to China. Between August 1912 and January 1913 they walked 1,560 miles, reaching Bosnia before lack of money made them turn back. Brenan spent the next ten months in Germany, learning the language, surprisingly in preparation for joining the Indian Police Service, but this plan was interrupted by the outbreak of the First World War in August 1914. He immediately joined the British Army and served in France throughout the war. After being demobbed in 1919, Hope-Johnstone introduced Brenan to the Bloomsbury Group. Roger Fry, a British Post-Impressionist painter and noted critic from the group would deem, "Gerald Brenda is almost the only writer who has the same sort of ideas about writing as we have about painting. I mean he believes that everything must come out of the matière of his prose and not out of the ideas and emotions he describes."

In 1919 he moved to Spain, and from 1920 on he rented a house in the small village of Yegen, in the Alpujarras district of the province of Granada. He spent his time catching up on the education which he felt he had missed by not attending university, and in writing. An important factor in his moving to Spain was his calculation that his small income would go further there. Despite the remoteness of his new home, contacts with the Bloomsbury Group continued, particularly with his best friend Ralph Partridge and Partridge's first wife Dora Carrington, with whom Brenan had an affair. In the late 1920s he formed a relationship with his maid, Juliana Martin Pelegrina, which in 1931 resulted in the birth of a daughter, Miranda Helen, who later lived in France.

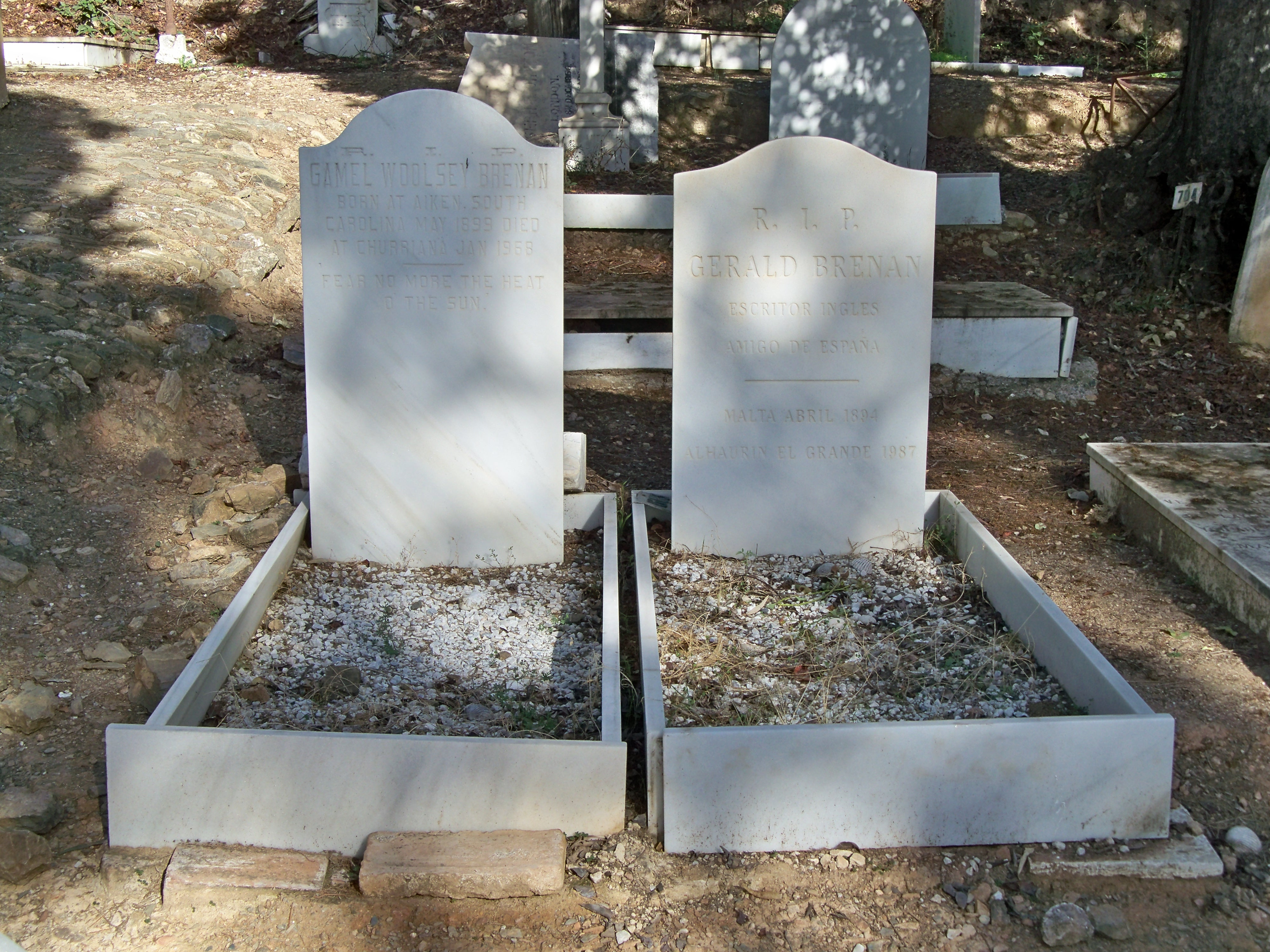
Gamel Woolsey and Gerald Brenan's graves at the English Cemetery in Málaga

In 1930, he met the American poet and novelist Gamel Woolsey (1895–1968) in Dorset; they married in Rome in 1931. They lived in Churriana, a village near Málaga, during the early part of the Spanish Civil War, befriending the 72-year-old zoologist, Sir Peter Chalmers Mitchell. Like Sir Peter, they provided safe haven to a right-wing sympathiser, despite objecting to his political views, staying on in Spain until the city was occupied by Italian forces sent by Mussolini to support the fascist rebels. This interlude is documented in Sir Peter's memoir, My House in Málaga, and also in Woolsey's memoir, Death's Other Kingdom. The couple then returned to England and for many years afterwards they lived in Aldbourne in Wiltshire. Brenan was permitted to return to Spain in 1949 despite holding views which were critical of Franco's regime. Gamel Woolsey died in Spain in 1968 of cancer, and is buried at the English Cemetery, Málaga. Brenan spent most of the remainder of his life in Churriana near Málaga and after Woolsey's death, in Alhaurín el Grande, Málaga.

In 1984 Brenan was moved to a nursing home in Pinner, Middlesex. There was some controversy as to whether he wanted to live in England, and he returned to Spain after the authorities there made special arrangements to provide him with the nursing care on which he depended in his old age. At the time of his death, his body was donated to the Medicine Faculty of Málaga for medical research and later cremated; his ashes are buried in the English Cemetery, Málaga. A Life of One's Own and A Personal Record together make up his autobiography.

== Works ==
- Jack Robinson. A Picaresque Novel (1933) as George Beaton
- Doctor Partridge's Almanack for 1935 (1934) as George Beaton
- Shanahan's Old Shebeen, or The Mornin's Mornin' (1940)
- The Spanish Labyrinth: An Account of the Social and Political Background of the Civil War (1943)
- The Spanish Scene (1946) Current Affairs No.7
- The Face of Spain (1950)
- The Literature of the Spanish People – From Roman Times to the Present Day (1951)
- South From Granada: Seven Years in an Andalusian Village (1957)
- A Holiday by the Sea (1961)
- A Life of One's Own: Childhood and Youth (1962; reissued 1975)
- The Lighthouse Always Says Yes (1966)
- St John of the Cross: His life and Poetry (1973) with Lynda Nicholson
- A Personal Record, 1920–1972 (1975)
- The Magnetic Moment; Poems (1978)
- Thoughts in a Dry Season: A Miscellany (1978)
- "The Lord of the Castle and his Prisoner. He. Intended as an Autobiographical Sequence of Thoughts" (2009)
- (in Spanish) Diarios sobre Dora Carrington y otros escritos (1925–1932), editorial Confluencias, 2012.

He left uncompleted a work on Spanish poetry which was published posthumously as La Copla Popular Española.

== In popular culture ==
- Samuel West portrays Brenan in the 1995 British biographical film Carrington about the life of the English painter Dora Carrington, written and directed by Christopher Hampton based on the book Lytton Strachey by Michael Holroyd.
- Matthew Goode portrays Brenan in the 2003 Goya Award winning Spanish film Al sur de Granada, written and directed by Fernando Colomo, based on the 1957 autobiographical book South from Granada.
