= South from Granada =

Autobiographical book by Gerald Brenan

South from Granada: Seven Years in an Andalusian Village
- Author: Gerald Brenan
- Language: English
- Subject: Travel Literature
- Published: 1957
- Media type: Print

South from Granada: Seven Years in an Andalusian Village is an autobiographical book by Gerald Brenan, first published in 1957.

Brenan, a fringe member of the Bloomsbury Group, settled in Spain in 1920, and lived there on and off for the rest of his life. The book is an example of travel literature, mixing an autobiographical account of his life in Yegen, the village where he found his first home in Spain, with detailed background information about the Alpujarras region of Andalusia. He describes visits to his home by Virginia Woolf, Lytton Strachey, and Dora Carrington, and also devotes space to Spanish prehistory, particularly the Millaran culture.

== Film version ==
South from Granada has been adapted into a film, Al sur de Granada (2003), directed by Fernando Colomo. The film includes some biographical material not in the original book.
