= Dreadnought hoax =

Practical joke by Horace de Vere Cole in 1910

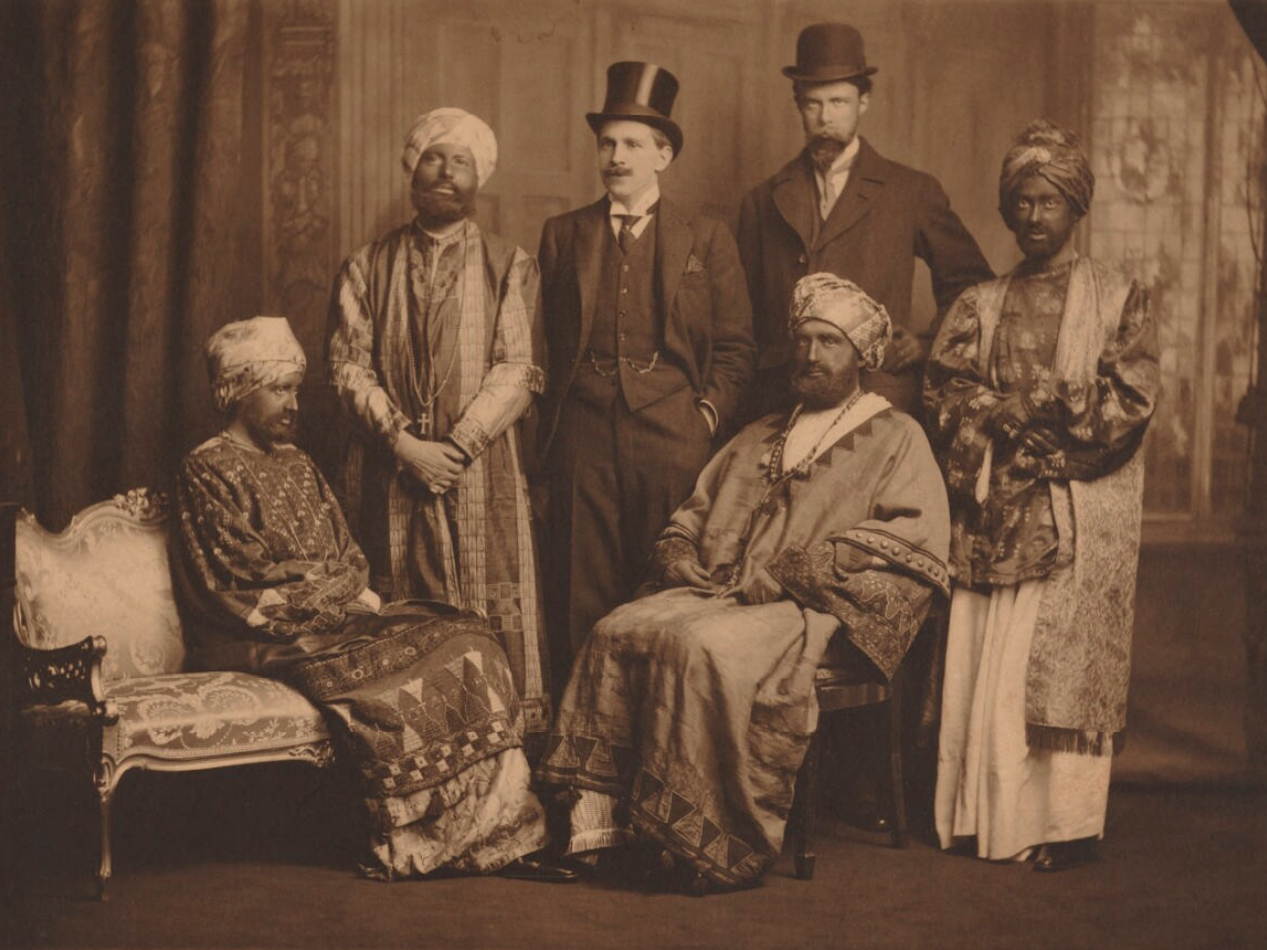
The Dreadnought hoaxers in blackface and Abyssinian costume

The Dreadnought hoax was a practical joke pulled by Horace de Vere Cole in 1910. Cole tricked the Royal Navy into showing their flagship, the battleship HMS Dreadnought, to a fake delegation of Abyssinian royals. The hoax drew attention in Britain to the emergence of the Bloomsbury Group, among whom some of Cole's collaborators numbered. The hoax was a repeat of a similar impersonation that Cole and Adrian Stephen had organised while they were students at Cambridge University in 1905.

== Background ==
=== Hoaxers ===
(left to right) Adrian Stephen, Robert Bowen Colthurst, Horace de Vere Cole, Leland Buxton and Lyulph "Drummer" Howard, in costume for the Sultan of Zanzibar hoax at Cambridge

Horace de Vere Cole was born in Ireland in 1881 to a well-to-do family. (Note: Cole's grandfather had made his fortune by cornering the market for quinine, which gave Cole's father an entry into society, an estate in Berkshire and a mansion in London.) He was commissioned into the Yorkshire Hussars and served in the Second Boer War, where he was seriously wounded and invalided out of service. On his return to Britain, he became an undergraduate at Trinity College, Cambridge; he studied little and spent his time entertaining and undertaking hoaxes and pranks.

One of Cole's closest friends at Trinity was Adrian Stephen, a keen sportsman and actor. Cole's biographer, Martyn Downer, considers that Stephen was a "perfect foil for ... [Cole]: someone sympathetic and encouraging yet unafraid to take him on". Stephen was the son of Leslie, the writer and critic, and Julia, the philanthropist and Pre-Raphaelite model. Adrian Stephen's elder brother, Thoby, was also at Trinity, and their sisters, Vanessa (later Vanessa Bell) and Virginia (later Virginia Woolf), would visit. After university, the four Stephen siblings became members of the Bloomsbury Group, the set of associated writers, intellectuals, philosophers and artists, many of whose members had also been at Trinity College. Cole was on the fringes of the group but never a member.

=== Cambridge Zanzibar hoax ===
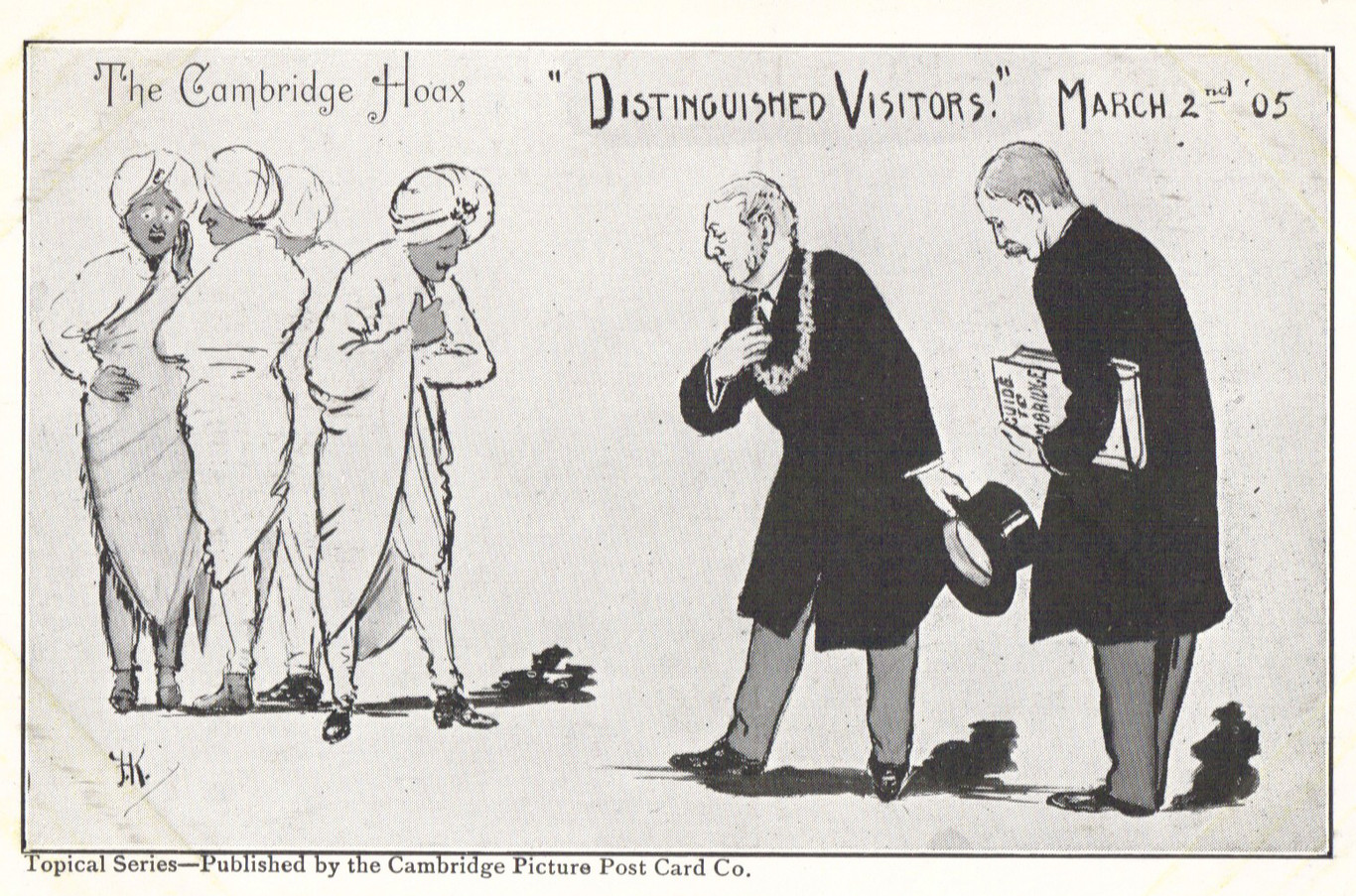
Postcard published after the Cambridge Hoax

In early 1905, while in their second year at Trinity College, Cambridge, Cole and Adrian Stephen decided to use a visit to England of Sayyid Ali bin Hamud Al-Busaid, the eighth Sultan of Zanzibar, as the basis for a hoax. A plan was put together to fake a state visit of the sultan to Cambridge, although they realised that as the sultan's picture had recently appeared in the press, there was a risk the visiting sultan would be shown as a fraud. They decided that Cole would impersonate the sultan's uncle rather than the sultan. On 2 March, they sent a telegram to the Mayor of Cambridge to ask if he could arrange a suitable reception for the sultan:

The Sultan of Zanzibar will arrive today at Cambridge at 4.27 for a short visit. Could you arrange to show him buildings of interest and send carriage?
Henry Lucas, Hotel Cecil, London

The students obtained robes and turbans from the theatrical costumier Willy Clarkson, applied blackface make-up and took the train from London. A carriage met the group at Cambridge railway station and took them to the guildhall, where they were met by the mayor and town clerk. After a brief reception they were taken on a tour of the town, including some of the university's colleges; the hoaxers were seen by some of their friends and acquaintances, who did not recognise them. After less than an hour they demanded to be returned to the station. As they did not want to return to London—returning from which would have meant them breaking the 10:00 pm college curfew—on arrival at the station, they ran out of a side exit and took two hansom cabs to a friend's house, where they changed back into their normal attire.

The following day Cole gave an interview to the Daily Mail about the hoax; the story appeared in the paper on 4 March 1905 and was repeated in local newspapers. The St James's Gazette considered the events "a most audacious practical joke". (Note: Among others, reports of the hoax appeared in Bradford Daily Telegraph, Eastern Evening News, Sheffield Evening Telegraph and Taunton Courier.) The Mayor wanted the students involved to be sent down (expelled), but was persuaded by the Vice-Chancellor that this would damage his reputation further.

=== Dreadnoughts and the Royal Navy ===
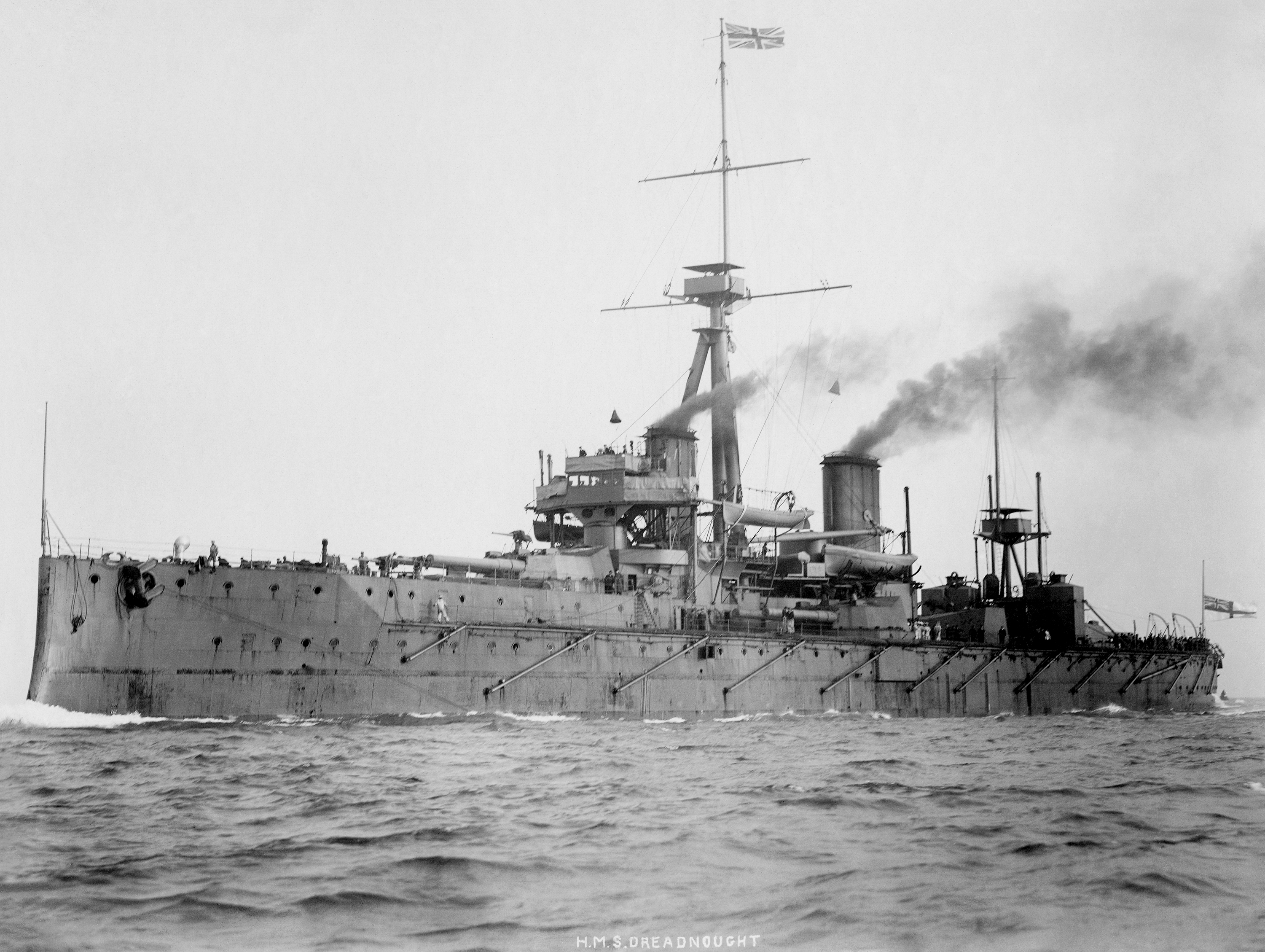
HMS Dreadnought at sea in 1906

In the early 20th century, Britain's naval fleet was seen as one of the foundations of its empire, and a reflection of the country's power and wealth. As Britain was portrayed in books, plays and popular culture as an island nation, the Royal Navy was seen as the defender of the island and its first line of defence. A leading article in The Observer in 1909 described the supremacy of the Royal Navy as "the best security for the world's peace and advancement".

HMS Dreadnought, the first of Britain's "dreadnought" class of battleship, entered into Royal Navy service in 1906. Dreadnought was the most technologically advanced ship built; it was better armed, faster and stronger than any other vessel afloat. According to the historian Jan Rüger, from the time the ship was launched, it took on cultural significance as a symbol and it entered into public consciousness through songs and advertising. When the ship visited London in 1909—part of three fleet reviews held—a million people were estimated to have watched its arrival, and by 1910 it "had become a cultural icon with undeniable symbolic status". Rüger gives examples of advertising for Oxo stock cubes: "Drink OXO and dread nought"; a tailoring business that used the slogan "Dreadnought and wear British clothing"; and "Dreadnought trams" ran, styled as battleships, and complete with imitation guns. The cultural historian Elisa deCourcy describes the Dreadnought as having "a near sacrosanct nature" for the Edwardians.

In February 1910 the captain of Dreadnought was Herbert Richmond; Admiral Sir William May was the Commander-in-Chief, Home Fleet; as such, Dreadnought was his flagship. Also present on Dreadnought was Commander Willie Fisher—the Stephens' cousin—who was on the staff of the Admiral. (Note: Fisher later became an Admiral and later became Commander-in-Chief of the Mediterranean Fleet.)

== Hoax ==
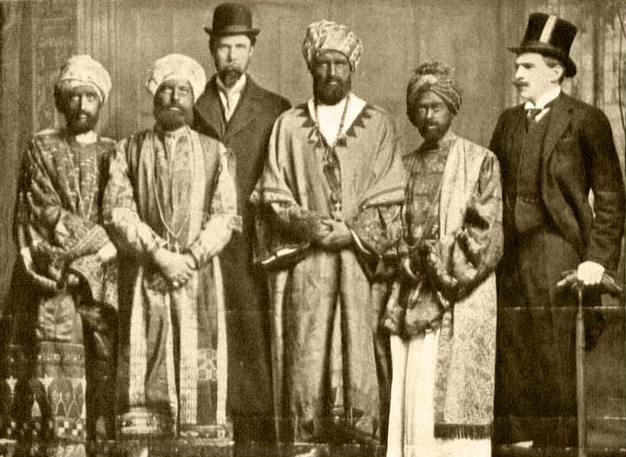
The Dreadnought hoaxers in Abyssinian costume

In a talk given in 1940 Woolf described how, in 1910, young naval officers enjoyed playing practical jokes on one another:

the officers of the Hawke and the Dreadnought had a feud. ... And Cole's friend who was on the Hawke had come to Cole, and said to him, "You're a great hand at hoaxing people; couldn't you do something to pull the leg of the Dreadnought? They want taking down a bit. Couldn't you manage to play off one of your jokes against them?"

This involved Cole and five friends—writer Virginia Stephen (later Virginia Woolf), her brother Adrian Stephen, Guy Ridley, Anthony Buxton and the artist Duncan Grant—who had themselves disguised by the theatrical costumier Willy Clarkson with skin darkeners and turbans to resemble members of the Abyssinian royal family. The main limitation of the disguises was that the "royals" could not eat anything or their make-up would be ruined. Adrian Stephen took the role of "interpreter".

On 7 February 1910 Clarkson's employees visited Woolf's home and applied the stage make-up to Woolf, Grant, Buxton and Ridley, then provided eastern robes. According to the Daily Mirror, they were also wearing £500 of jewellery; Martin Downer, in his biography of Cole, doubts the amount, which is not repeated by any of the participants.

A friend of Stephen's sent a telegram to the "C-in-C, Home Fleet" (Commander-in-chief of the vessels defending Britain) stating that "Prince Makalen of Abbysinia [sic] and suite arrive 4.20 today Weymouth. He wishes to see Dreadnought. Kindly arrange meet them on arrival"; the message was signed "Harding Foreign Office". Cole had found a post office staffed only by women, as he thought they were less likely to ask questions about the message. Cole, with his entourage, went to London's Paddington station where Cole claimed that he was "Herbert Cholmondeley" of the Foreign Office and demanded a special train to Weymouth; the stationmaster arranged a VIP coach.

In Weymouth, the navy welcomed the princes with an honour guard. An Abyssinian flag was not found, so the navy proceeded to use that of Zanzibar and to play Zanzibar's national anthem.

The group inspected the fleet. To show their appreciation, they communicated in a gibberish of words drawn from Latin and Greek; they asked for prayer mats and attempted to bestow fake military honours on some of the officers. Commander Fisher failed to recognise either of his cousins.

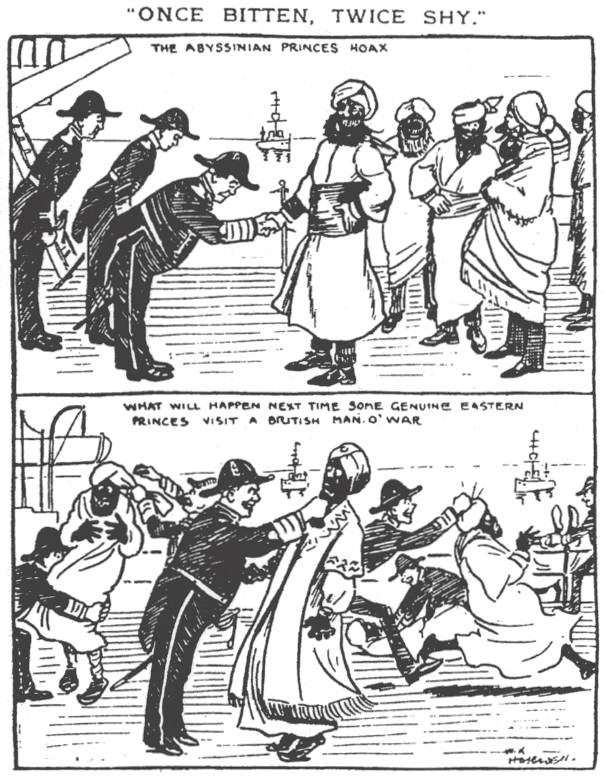
The hoax was widely reported, and the navy mocked

When the prank was uncovered in London, the ringleader Horace de Vere Cole contacted the press and sent a photo of the "princes" to the Daily Mirror. The group's pacifist views were considered a source of embarrassment, and the Royal Navy briefly became an object of ridicule. According to Virginia Woolf, writing at the time of events, Reginald McKenna, First Lord of the Admiralty, took the affair in good humour and was amazed that Duncan Grant and Adrian Stephen wished to apologise so as the officers would not lose face.

Nonetheless, the navy later demanded that Cole be arrested. However, Cole and his compatriots had not broken any law. Instead, except for Woolf, they were subjected to a symbolic thrashing on the buttocks by junior Royal Navy officers.

== Aftermath ==
According to press reports, during the visit to Dreadnought, the visitors repeatedly showed amazement or appreciation by exclaiming, "bunga bunga!" In 1915 during the First World War, HMS Dreadnought rammed and sank a German submarine—the only battleship ever to do so. Among the telegrams of congratulation was one that read "BUNGA BUNGA".

A song was heard in music halls that year, sung to the tune of "The Girl I Left Behind":

When I went on board a Dreadnought ship
I looked like a costermonger;
They said I was an Abyssinian prince
'Cos I shouted 'Bunga Bunga!'

Thirty years later, in 1940, Virginia Woolf gave talks about the Dreadnought hoax to the Rodmell Women's Institute and also to the Memoir Club, the latter attended by E. M. Forster.

== Sources ==
- Davenport-Hines, Richard (2004). "Cole, (William) Horace De Vere (1881–1936)". Oxford Dictionary of National Biography (online ed.). Oxford University Press. doi:10.1093/ref:odnb/61609. (Subscription, Wikipedia Library access or UK public library membership required.)
- de Chair, Dudley (1961). The Sea is Strong. London: Harrap. OCLC 5260541.
- deCourcy, Elisa (November 2017). "The Dreadnought Hoax Portrait as an Affront to the Edwardian Age". Early Popular Visual Culture. 15 (4): 405–424. doi:10.1080/17460654.2017.1379425. S2CID 191662022.
- Downer, Martyn (2010). The Sultan of Zanzibar: The Bizarre World and Spectacular Hoaxes of Horace de Vere Cole. London: Black Spring Press. ISBN 978-0-9482-3843-7.
- Dunley, Richard (16 October 2017). "Bunga bunga! The Great Edwardian Dreadnought Hoax". National Archives. Archived from the original on 9 May 2018.
- Johnston, Georgia (2009). "Virginia Woolf's Talk on the Dreadnought Hoax". Woolf Studies Annual. 15. Archived from the original on 3 October 2015 – via Questia.
- Jones, Danell (1 May 2013). "The Dreadnought Hoax and the Theatres of War". Literature & History. 22 (1): 80–94. doi:10.7227/LH.22.1.6. S2CID 191480258.
- Jones, Danell (2024). The Girl Prince: Virginia Woolf, Race and the Dreadnought Hoax (Hardcover). London: Hurst Publishers. ISBN 978-1805260066.
- Reid, Panthea (Summer 1999). "Virginia Woolf, Leslie Stephen, Julia Margaret Cameron, and the Prince of Abyssinia: An Inquiry into Certain Colonialist Representations". Biography. 22 (3): 323–355. doi:10.1353/bio.2010.0002. JSTOR 23540033. S2CID 26751393.
- Rüger, Jan (2007). The Great Naval Game: Britain and Germany in the Age of Empire. Cambridge: Cambridge University Press. ISBN 978-0-521-87576-9.
- Rüger, Jan (2011). "The Symbolic Value of the Dreadnought". In Lambert, Andrew D.; Blyth, Robert J.; Rüger, Jan (eds.). The Dreadnought and the Edwardian Age. Farnham, Surrey: Ashgate Publishing. ISBN 978-0-7546-6315-7.
- Stansky, Peter (1997). On or About December 1910: Early Bloomsbury and its Intimate World. Cambridge, MA: Harvard University Press. ISBN 978-0-674-63606-4.
- Stephen, Adrian (1983) [1936]. The 'Dreadnought' Hoax. London: Chatto & Windus. ISBN 978-0-7011-2747-3.
- Thursfield, H. G.; Brodie, Marc (2012). "Fisher, Sir William Wordsworth (1875–1937)". Oxford Dictionary of National Biography (online ed.). Oxford University Press. doi:10.1093/ref:odnb/33147. (Subscription, Wikipedia Library access or UK public library membership required.)
- "Hoaxed Mayor". Bradford Daily Telegraph. 4 March 1905. p. 3.
- "Hoaxing a Mayor". Sheffield Evening Telegraph. 4 March 1905. p. 3.
- "A Mayor Hoaxed". Taunton Courier. 8 March 1905. p. 3.
- "Our Floating Foundations". The Observer. 18 July 1909. p. 8.
- "Story of the Cambridge Hoax". Eastern Evening News. 8 March 1905. p. 4.
- "Undergraduate's Hoax". St James's Gazette. 4 March 1905. p. 12.
