= George Herbert Duckworth =

English public servant (1868–1934)

Sir George Herbert Duckworth CB FSA
- Born: 5 March 1868
- Died: 27 April 1934 (aged 66)
- Education: Eton College; Trinity College, Cambridge
- Mother: Julia Stephen
- Relatives: Gerald Duckworth (brother); Vanessa Bell (half-sister); Virginia Woolf (half-sister)

Sir George Herbert Duckworth, CB, FSA (5 March 1868 – 27 April 1934) was an English public servant.

== Early life and family ==
The son of Herbert Duckworth, a barrister, of Orchardleigh Park, Somerset, by his marriage to Julia Prinsep Jackson, a niece of the photographer Julia Margaret Cameron, Duckworth had a younger brother, Gerald, who later founded the London publishing firm of Duckworth & Co, and a sister, Stella (1869–1897).

After Herbert Duckworth's death, Julia married secondly the author Leslie Stephen, and Duckworth was thus a half-brother of the painter Vanessa Bell and the writer Virginia Woolf, leading members of the Bloomsbury Group, and of Thoby and Adrian Stephen. Both sisters, Vanessa Bell and Virginia Woolf later accused their two Duckworth half-brothers of sexually abusing them for many years as children and adolescents.

Duckworth was educated at Eton, where in 1886 he was a member of the First XI for cricket, and then at Trinity College, Cambridge.

== Career ==
From 1892 to 1902, Duckworth acted as secretary (without pay) to the philanthropist Charles Booth, and then from August 1902 to 1905 as private secretary to Austen Chamberlain, at a time when Chamberlain was in the Cabinet, first as Postmaster General and then as Chancellor of the Exchequer.

From 1906 to 1908, Duckworth was secretary to the Treasury Committee on War Risks of Shipping, and from 1908 to 1933 Secretary to the Royal Commission on Historical Monuments. During the First World War he was appointed deputy Director of Munitions Finance, serving from 1915 to 1918, and, in 1918, as Controller of Labour Finance. In 1919, he became a Companion of the Order of the Bath.

After the war, from 1919 to 1920, he was Controller of Munitions Housing Schemes. In 1924, he became a Trustee and first Chairman of the Irish Land Trust, which had the aim of providing houses and land for ex-service men in Ireland.

In the 1927 Birthday Honours, he was knighted and the same year served as a member of the Royal Commission on London Squares and Open Spaces. The next year, 1928, he was on the Advisory Committee on the New Survey of London Life and Labour.

== Private life ==
On 10 September 1904, Duckworth married Lady Margaret Leonora Evelyn Selina Herbert (1870–1959), a daughter of Henry Herbert, 4th Earl of Carnarvon, and together they had three sons.

They lived at Dalingridge Place, West Hoathly, Sussex. Duckworth was a member of the Travellers and Garrick Clubs in London.

Duckworth was Honorary Treasurer of the Royal Archæological Institute and a Fellow of the Society of Antiquaries of London.

Anthony Duckworth-Chad is Duckworth's grandson.
