= Bloomsbury Group in LGBT history =

The Bloomsbury Group plays a prominent role in the LGBT history of its day.

== Before the First World War ==
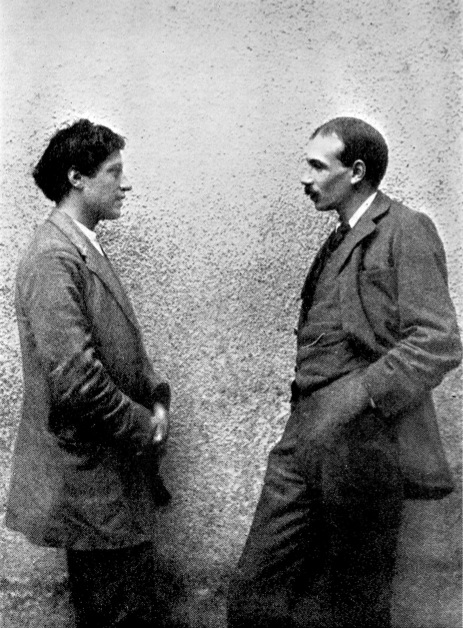
Duncan Grant and Maynard Keynes

While still in the Bloomsbury area LGBT activity was all very much in a single group. For example, Duncan Grant, a homosexual with bisexual leanings, had affairs with Maynard Keynes, James Strachey, Adrian Stephen, David Garnett and straight Vanessa Bell.

Names of LGBT people outside the Bloomsbury Group strictly speaking include Mary Garman, Nina Hamnett, Jane Ellen Harrison, Rupert Brooke and Arthur Hobhouse.

D. H. Lawrence had criticised the homosexual tendencies in the Bloomsbury Group, though close to the core members of the group

== During and after the First World War ==
Later the groups differentiated. Keynes married Lydia Lopokova, and gradually ceased having affairs with men. Other groups more or less split according to the location where they started to live.

Most of LGBT men in and around the Bloomsbury Group were conscientious objector during the war: they had to leave London in order to do manual labour on the land.

=== Lady Ottoline Morrell's circle ===
Lady Ottoline Morrell's extravagant parties no longer brought the group together, but during the First World War she did provide housing for conscientious objector Aldous Huxley at Garsington Manor, where he was married to Maria Nys after the war. D. H. Lawrence, another visitor of Garsington, befriended Huxley.

=== Charleston ===
Also Duncan Grant and David Garnett had to work on the land as conscientious objectors during World War I. They started living with Vanessa Bell in Charleston Farmhouse.

Francis Birrell started a bookshop together with David Garnett later on.

=== Lytton Strachey and Dora Carrington ===
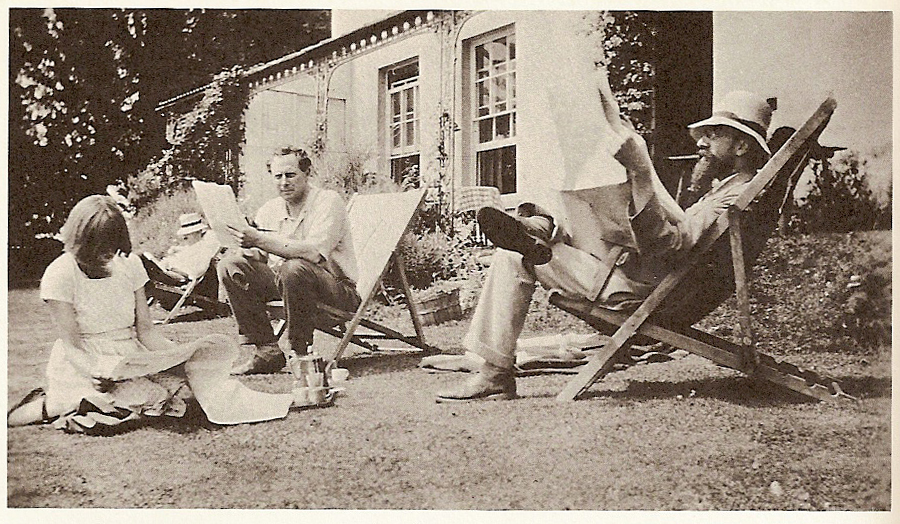
Dora Carrington, Ralph Partridge and Lytton Strachey

Also during the First World War Lytton Strachey and Dora Carrington moved to Tidmarsh Mill House. Later (in a ménage à trois with straight Ralph Partridge) they moved to Ham Spray House.

Roger Senhouse, had been Strachey's last lover

=== E. M. Forster ===
E. M. Forster spent his time as conscientious objector in Egypt, and remained there some time after the First World War.

When returning to England his circle of LGBT friends and acquaintances included W. J. H. Sprott, J. R. Ackerley, Christopher Isherwood, Siegfried Sassoon, Forrest Reid and Benjamin Britten.

=== Virginia Woolf ===
Virginia and Leonard Woolf first moved to Hogarth House in the London Borough of Richmond upon Thames, where they set up the Hogarth Press. Later they moved to Monk's House in East Sussex.

==== Hogarth Press ====
Katherine Mansfield and John Lehmann were LGBT acquaintances linked to Hogarth Press, the publishing company Virginia Woolf owned with her husband Leonard Woolf.

==== Orlando ====
After Virginia Woolf had moved to Monk's House, she would meet Vita Sackville-West, writing her Roman à clef Orlando: A Biography about her. Woolf also met the LGBT people around her, including Harold Nicolson, Sackville-West's husband, Benedict Nicolson, their LGBT son and Violet Trefusis, her former lover.

==== Other ====
Composer and suffragist Ethel Smyth was another later acquaintance of Virginia Woolf.

== Bibliography ==
- Todd Avery. Radio Modernism: Literature, Ethics, and the BBC, 1922-1938. Ashgate Publishing, Ltd.; 1 January 2006. ISBN 978-0-7546-5517-6.
- Peter Clarke. Keynes. Bloomsbury Press, 2009. pp. 56, 57. ISBN 978-1-60819-023-2.
- Angelica Garnett. Deceived with Kindness (1984)
- Hermione Lee, Virginia Woolf London: Chatto & Windus, 1996.
- Ian Ousby ed., The Cambridge Guide to Literature in English (Cambridge 1995)
- Souhami, Diana (1997). Mrs. Keppel and Her Daughter. Portrait of a Lesbian Affair: St. Martin's Griffin. pp. 123–223. ISBN 978-0-312-19517-5. "denys trefusis and violet trefusis."
- Frances Spalding. Virginia Woolf: Paper Darts: the Illustrated Letters (1991)
