= Anthony Buxton =

British Army officer and writer (1881–1970)

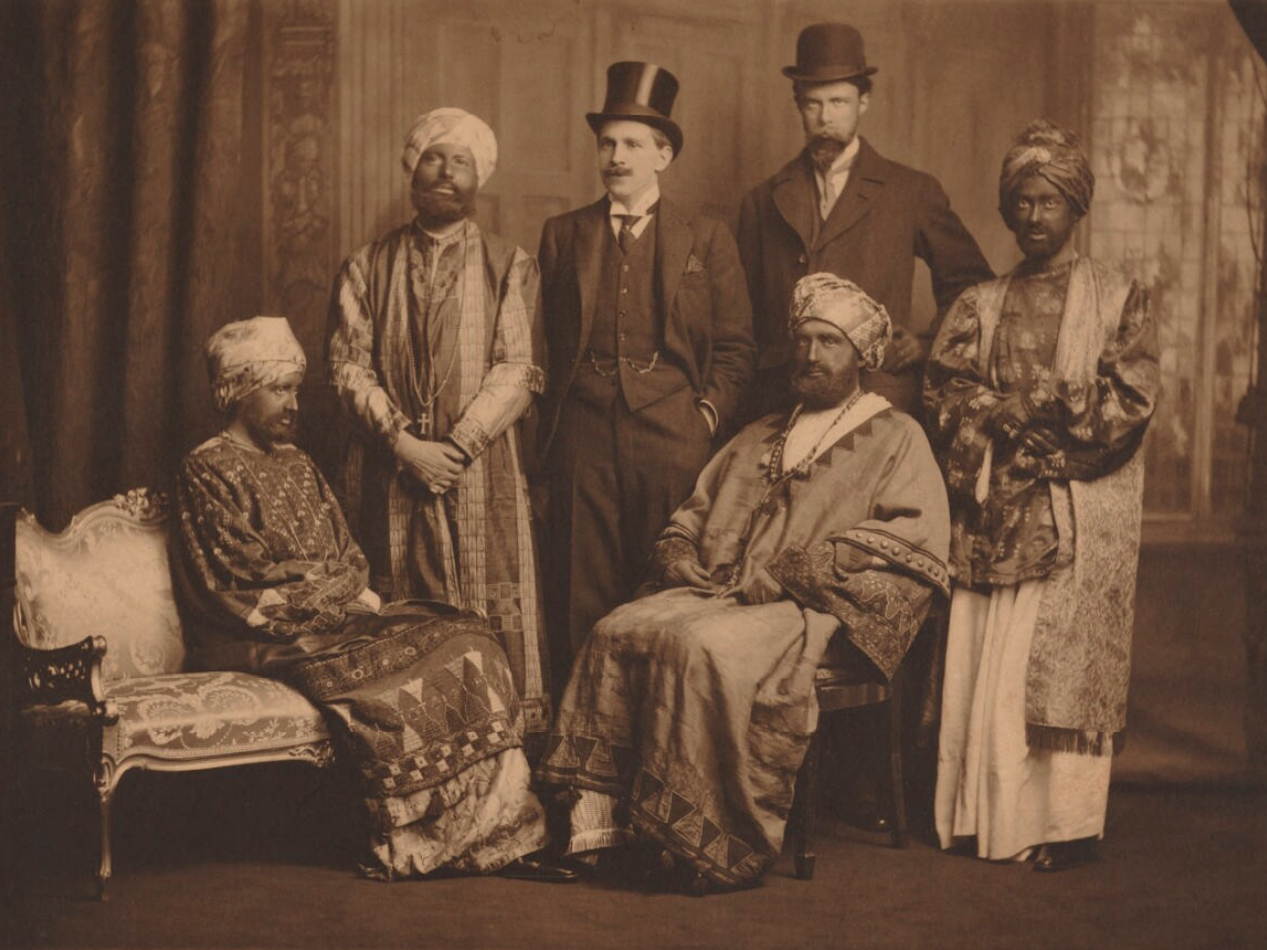
- Buxton (second from right, seated) among other Dreadnought hoaxers
- Born: 2 September 1881
- Died: 9 August 1970 (aged 88)
- Education: Harrow School; Trinity College, Cambridge
- Spouse: Mary Philomena
- Children: 4
- Relatives: Edward North Buxton (father)
- Military career
- Allegiance: United Kingdom
- Branch: British Army
- Unit: Essex Yeomanry
- Conflicts: First World War

Anthony Buxton DSO DL JP (2 September 1881 – 9 August 1970) was a British Army officer and author. He was the youngest son of Edward North Buxton. He was educated at Harrow and Trinity College, Cambridge. In 1910 he was involved in the infamous Dreadnought hoax by the Bloomsbury Group.

During the First World War he served as an officer in the Essex Yeomanry, was wounded, mentioned in dispatches, and was awarded the DSO in 1916. He was appointed a deputy lieutenant of Essex in 1920. He married a Scotswoman, Mary Philomena (née Constable Maxwell) in 1926. They had a son and three daughters. She died in 1953 He lived at Horsey Hall in Norfolk. He was High Sheriff of Norfolk in 1945.

His publications include:

- Sport in Peace and War
- Sporting Interludes at Geneva, 1932
- Fisherman Naturalist, 1946
- Travelling Naturalist, 1948
- Happy Year, 1950
- Plus contributions to reviews and newspapers

Honorary titles
Preceded by Percy Charles Briscoe	High Sheriff of Norfolk; 1945	Succeeded by Charles Fountaine
