= The Waves =

1931 novel by Virginia Woolf

- First edition cover
- Author: Virginia Woolf
- Cover artist: Vanessa Bell
- Language: English
- Genre: Experimental novel
- Publisher: Hogarth Press
- Publication date: 22 October 1931
- Publication place: United Kingdom
- Pages: 324

The Waves is a 1931 novel by English novelist Virginia Woolf. It is critically regarded as the culmination of her experimental lyric technique, consisting of ambiguous and cryptic soliloquies spoken by six characters: Bernard, Susan, Rhoda, Neville, Jinny and Louis. Percival, a seventh character, appears in the soliloquies, though readers never hear him speak in his own voice.

The dialogues that span the characters' lives are broken up by nine brief third-person interludes detailing a coastal scene at varying stages in a day from sunrise to sunset. As the six characters or "voices" speak, Woolf explores concepts of individuality, self and community. “Each character is distinct, yet together they compose a gestalt about a silent central consciousness”, according to a reviewer.

In a 2015 poll conducted by the BBC, The Waves was voted the 16th greatest British novel ever written.

== Plot ==
The novel follows its six narrators from childhood through adulthood. Woolf is concerned with the individual consciousness and the ways in which multiple consciousnesses can weave together.

Bernard is a story-teller, always seeking some elusive and apt phrase. Some critics see Woolf's friend E. M. Forster as an inspiration for him.

Louis is an outsider who seeks acceptance and success. Some critics see in him aspects of T. S. Eliot, whom Woolf knew well.

Neville, who may be partly based on another of Woolf's friends, Lytton Strachey, seeks out a series of men, each of whom becomes the present object of his transcendent love.

Jinny is a socialite whose world view corresponds to her physical beauty. There is evidence that she is based on Woolf's friend Mary Hutchinson.

Susan flees the city, preferring the countryside, where she grapples with the thrills and doubts of motherhood. Some aspects of Susan recall Woolf's sister Vanessa Bell.

Rhoda is riddled with self-doubt, anxiety and depression, always rejecting and indicting human compromise, always seeking out solitude. She echoes Shelley's poem "The Question". Rhoda resembles Virginia Woolf in some respects.

Percival, partly based on Woolf's brother, Thoby Stephen, is the esteemed hero of the other six. He dies midway through the novel, while engaged on an imperialist quest in India. Percival never speaks on his own in The Waves, but readers learn about him in detail as the other six characters repeatedly describe and reflect on him.

== Style ==
The difficulty of assigning genre to this novel is complicated by the fact that The Waves blurs distinctions between prose and poetry, allowing the novel to flow between six interior monologues. The book similarly breaks down boundaries between people, and Woolf herself wrote in her Diary that the six were not meant to be separate "characters" at all, but rather facets of consciousness illuminating a sense of continuity. Even the term "novel" may not accurately describe the complex form of The Waves as is described in the literary biography of Woolf by Julia Briggs (An Inner Life, Allen Lane 2005). Woolf called it not a novel but a "playpoem".

The book explores the role of the "ethos of male education" in shaping public life, and includes scenes of some of the characters experiencing bullying during their first days at school.

== Reception ==
Marguerite Yourcenar translated The Waves into French over a period of ten months in 1937. She met Virginia Woolf during this period and wrote: "I do not believe I am committing an error ... when I put Virginia Woolf among the four or five great virtuosos of the English language and among the rare contemporary novelists whose work stands some chance of lasting more than ten years."

Although The Waves is not one of Virginia Woolf's most popular works, it is highly regarded. Literary scholar Frank N. Magill ranked it one of the 200 best books of all time in his reference book, Masterpieces of World Literature. In The Independent, British author Amy Sackville wrote that "as a reader, as a writer, I constantly return, for the lyricism of it, the melancholy, the humanity."

Theatre director Katie Mitchell, who adapted The Waves for the stage, called the work "entrancing […] Woolf's point is that the lasting and significant events in our lives are small and insignificant in the eyes of the outside world."
