= Anthony Duckworth-Chad =

British businessman

Anthony Nicholas George Duckworth-Chad OBE DL (born 1942), of Pynkney Hall, in Tattersett near King's Lynn, Norfolk, England, is a landowner, City of London business man, and a senior county officer for Norfolk.

== Early life and education ==
Duckworth-Chad is son of Anthony John Stanhope Duckworth, of Dodges House, Sharpthorne, near East Grinstead, Sussex, and Audrey Diana, daughter of J. N. Tollenaar, of Sloane Street. He was educated at Eton College and Royal Agricultural College, Cirencester. His paternal grandfather was Sir George Herbert Duckworth, half-brother of the painter Vanessa Bell and writer Virginia Woolf. Duckworth-Chad's great-uncle, Gerald Duckworth founded the London publishing firm of Duckworth & Co; Duckworth-Chad agreed to become the heir of his great-uncle's widow with the stipulation that he would add her maiden name, Chad, to his own.

== Career ==
He is a liveryman and past Prime Warden of the Worshipful Company of Fishmongers of the City of London, Chairman of the Governing Body of Gresham's School, Holt, vice-president of the Anglers’ Conservation Association, Trustee of the Country Land and Business Association Charitable Trust, and Trustee of the Rudhams Playing Fields Trust. In 1992, Duckworth-Chad was appointed High Sheriff of Norfolk. He now serves as a Deputy Lieutenant of Norfolk.

In 1999, he was appointed an Officer of the Order of the British Empire (OBE) for services to the Country Landowners' Association and the Rural Community.

== Personal life ==
In 1970, Duckworth-Chad married (Elizabeth) Sarah Wake-Walker, a granddaughter of the seventh Earl Spencer. They have two sons and a daughter. Duckworth-Chad's wife, Elizabeth Wake-Walker, is a first cousin of Diana, Princess of Wales.

== See also ==
- Worshipful Company of Fishmongers
- Gresham's School
