= Guy Ridley =

English barrister

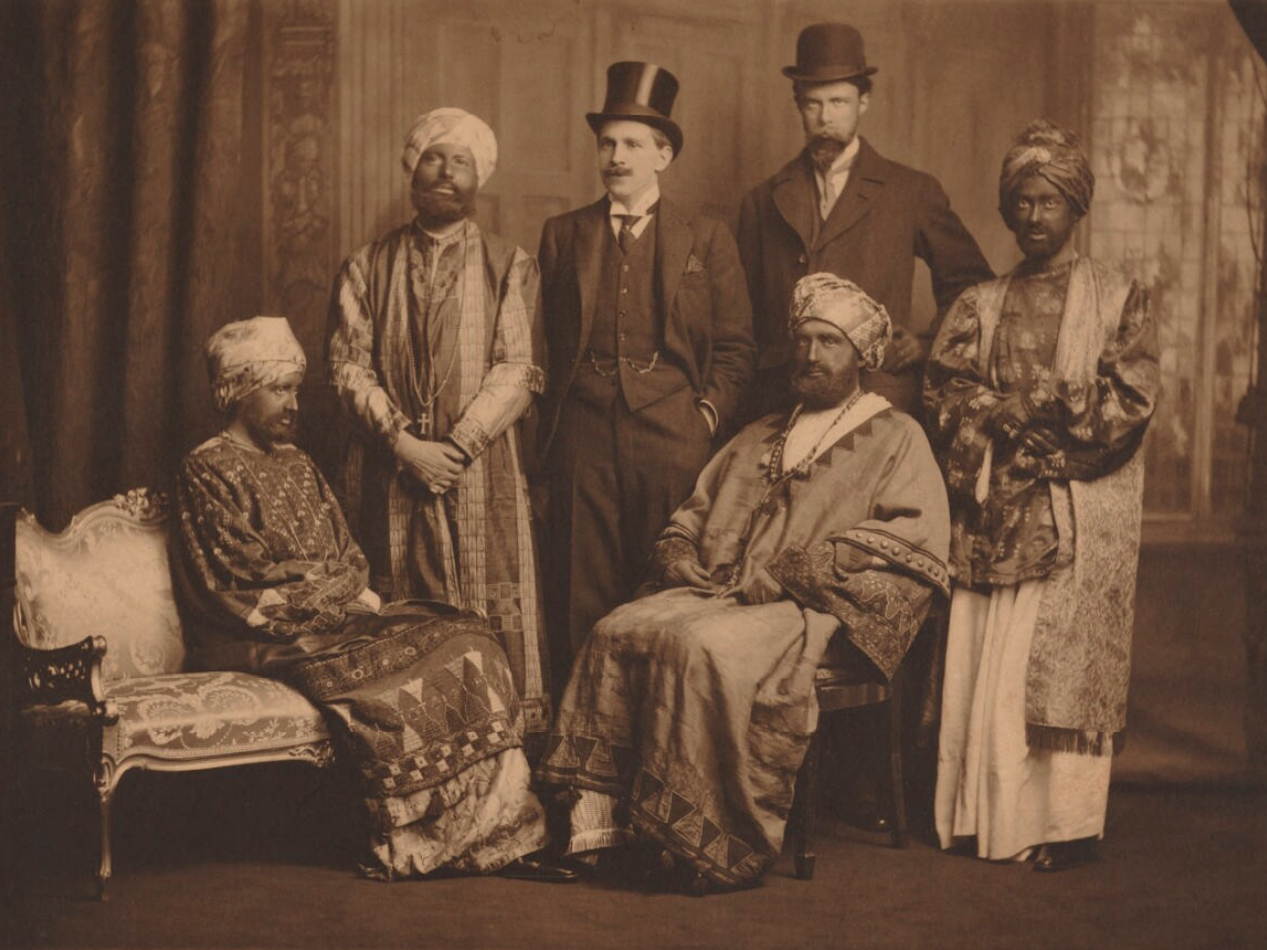
Ridley (first from right) among other Dreadnought hoaxers in 1910

Cecil Guy Ridley CBE (21 June 1885 – 15 November 1947) was an English barrister and Master in Lunacy. He was the son of the judge Sir Edward Ridley, and was educated at Harrow and New College, Oxford. He was on the fringes of the Bloomsbury Group and was recruited to participate in the Dreadnought hoax in 1910. In 1914 he published the short fantasy novel The Word of Teregor, notable for being a novel of sentient trees, one called Enteth, who converse in moots.

His only other known print publication is the highly patriotic poem "The Union Jack Club", published in Belloc's conservative Catholic magazine Land and Water for 16 November 1916. His CBE was awarded in 1918 for his important legal work during the First World War at Scotland Yard. He worked there as the Staff Officer to the Chief of the Special Constabulary. He was private secretary to Sir Edward Ward, 1st Baronet, of Wilbraham Place. In 1928, at age 45, he made a late marriage with the musical comedy star Cicely Debenham (1891-1955).
