= Gerald Duckworth =

English publisher (1870–1937)

- Born: 29 October 1870; England
- Died: 28 September 1937 (aged 66); Milan, Italy
- Education: Eton College; Clare College, Cambridge
- Occupation: Publisher
- Known for: Founder of Gerald Duckworth and Company Ltd
- Spouse: Cecil Alice Scott-Chad (m. 1921)

Gerald de l'Etang Duckworth (29 October 1870 – 28 September 1937) was an English publisher, who founded the London company that bears his name. Henry James and John Galsworthy were among the firm's early authors.

== Background and early life ==
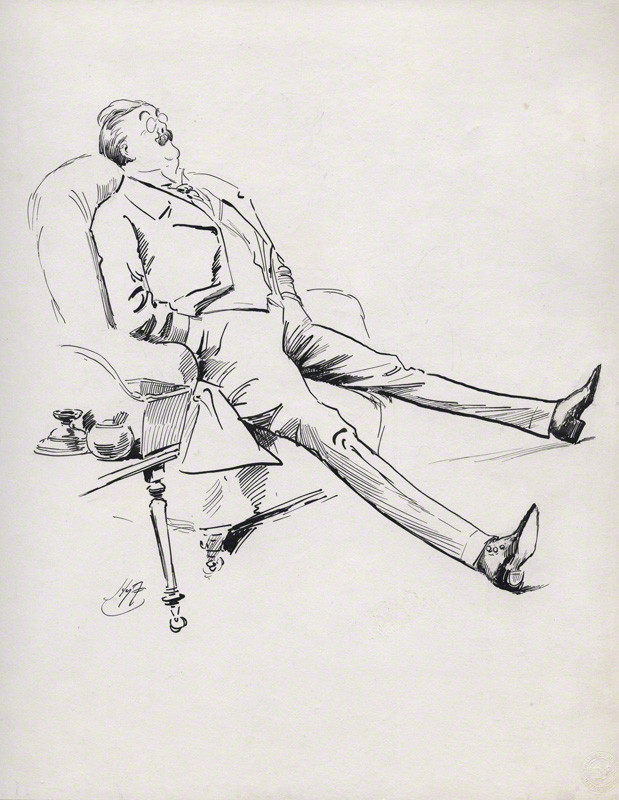
Gerald Duckworth by Harry Furniss

Duckworth was a son of Herbert Duckworth, a London barrister, by his wife Julia Jackson. His father was the youngest son of William Duckworth of Orchardleigh in Somerset. His middle name, de l'Etang, was the surname of one of his mother's ancestors, Antoine de l'Etang, a page to Queen Marie Antoinette. His mother was a niece of Julia Margaret Cameron, the photographer, after whom she was named.

Duckworth's father died before his birth. When he was eight his mother married the author Leslie Stephen and had four more children: Virginia Stephen, later the author Virginia Woolf, the painter Vanessa Bell, and two sons, Thoby and Adrian Stephen. Gerald and his elder brother George were later accused by Virginia and Vanessa of sexually abusing them when they were children and teenagers. Woolf published her first two novels with her brother's help, before forming the Hogarth Press.

Gerald Duckworth was educated at Eton College and Clare College, Cambridge.

== Career ==
In 1898, Duckworth founded the publishing company that bears his name, Gerald Duckworth and Company Ltd, in Henrietta Street, Covent Garden. In his first year, 1898–1899, he published Henry James's In the Cage; Leslie Stephen's English Literature and Society in the Eighteenth Century; Jocelyn by John Sinjohn, a pseudonym of John Galsworthy; a translation of August Strindberg's Der Vater; and Mother Goose in Prose, the first children's book by L. Frank Baum, and the first book illustrated by Maxfield Parrish. (Baum's most famous work, The Wonderful Wizard of Oz, was published in Chicago a year later.)

Edward Garnett (whose son David would marry Duckworth's niece Angelica Bell) was Duckworth's reader for nearly twenty years. The firm published W. H. Hudson, Charles M. Doughty, D. H. Lawrence, Evelyn Waugh, Virginia Woolf, and most of the work of Edith Sitwell, Osbert Sitwell, and Sacheverell Sitwell. It published all of John Galsworthy's plays between 1909 and 1929.

In 1929, Galsworthy was shocked that Duckworth required him to sign all 1,250 copies of a limited edition of his collected plays. But when told he would get a royalty of 15s. 9d. per copy, he set up his watch and said: "Let's see how long it takes me to earn £984 7s. 6d."

Duckworth died in Milan, Italy, in 1937, but the firm continued to thrive. It marked its centenary in 1998, but then ran into financial troubles in 2003. It was bought out by Peter Mayer, although it has continued to publish under the name of Duckworth.

== Representations ==
Three portraits of Duckworth are held by the National Portrait Gallery. Anthony Powell became Duckworth's literary editor in 1926, and the publisher "Judkins & Judkins" in his novel, What's Become of Waring (1939), is modelled on Duckworth's.

== Family ==
On 2 March 1921, Duckworth married Cecil Alice Scott-Chad (born 1891), the daughter of Charles Scott-Chad, a barrister, and cousin of the footballing barrister George Scott-Chad. She and Duckworth had no children.

Duckworth's older brother Sir George Herbert Duckworth (1868–1934) was private secretary to Austen Chamberlain. He became the grandfather of Anthony Duckworth-Chad. His sister Stella (1869–1897) married John Waller Hills, but died three months later.
