= Ian Ousby =

British historian and writer (1947–2001)

- Born: 26 June 1947 Marlborough, Wiltshire, England
- Died: 6 August 2001 (aged 54)
- Occupation: Historian, author
- Education: Magdalene College, Cambridge; Harvard University
- Genre: Mystery fiction, military history

Ian Vaughan Kenneth Ousby (26 June 1947 – 6 August 2001) was a British historian, author and editor.

== Biography ==
Ian Ousby was born in Marlborough, Wiltshire, to an army officer and his wife. Ousby's father was stabbed to death in India in 1947 during the Partition, leaving his mother to raise him. He was educated at Bishop's Stortford College before matriculating to Magdalene College, Cambridge, where he gained a double first in English and was awarded a Fulbright Scholarship in 1968 to study at Harvard University. While at Harvard, Ousby was awarded the Howard Mumford Jones Prize for the best doctoral thesis of the year.

Following graduation, Ousby became an academic, teaching English literature at Durham University and the University of Maryland. An "intense dislike of organisations, as well as strong and divergent specialist interests", resulted in him leaving the University of Maryland in 1983 to become a freelance writer.

The subjects of his books ranged from detective fiction, with Bloodhounds of Heaven: The Detective in English Fiction from Godwin to Doyle to military history with The Road to Verdun and Occupation: the ordeal of France, 1940–1944, which was awarded the Edith McLeod Literary Prize and the Stern Silver PEN for Non-Fiction in 1998. His most noted work was as editor of The Cambridge Guide to Literature in English, which was first published in 1988 and republished in various forms in 1993, 1996 and 1998. After being diagnosed with cancer, he died on 6 August 2001.
