= Thoby Stephen =

Founding member of the Bloomsbury Group (1880-1906)

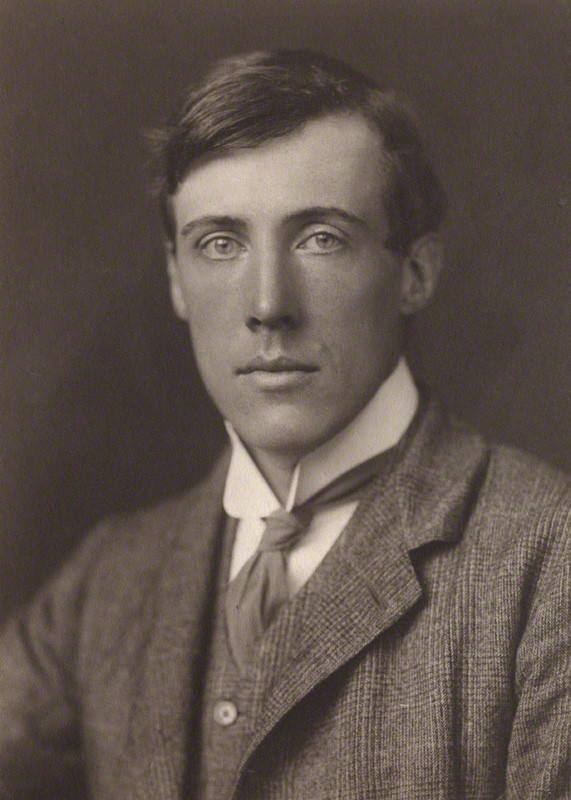
- Thoby Stephen by George Charles Beresford
- Born: Julian Thoby Stephen; 9 September 1880
- Died: 20 November 1906 (aged 26); England
- Parent(s): Leslie Stephen; Julia Stephen
- Relatives: Vanessa Bell (sister); Virginia Woolf (sister); Adrian Stephen (brother); George Duckworth (maternal half-brother); Gerald Duckworth (maternal half-brother)

Julian Thoby Stephen (9 September 1880 – 20 November 1906), known as the Goth, was the brother of Vanessa Bell and Virginia Woolf, both prominent members of the Bloomsbury Group, and of Adrian Stephen.

Thoby Stephen was the eldest son of Leslie Stephen and Julia Prinsep Stephen. The result of his mother's second marriage, he was therefore a half-brother of George and Gerald Duckworth, her sons with first husband Herbert Duckworth.

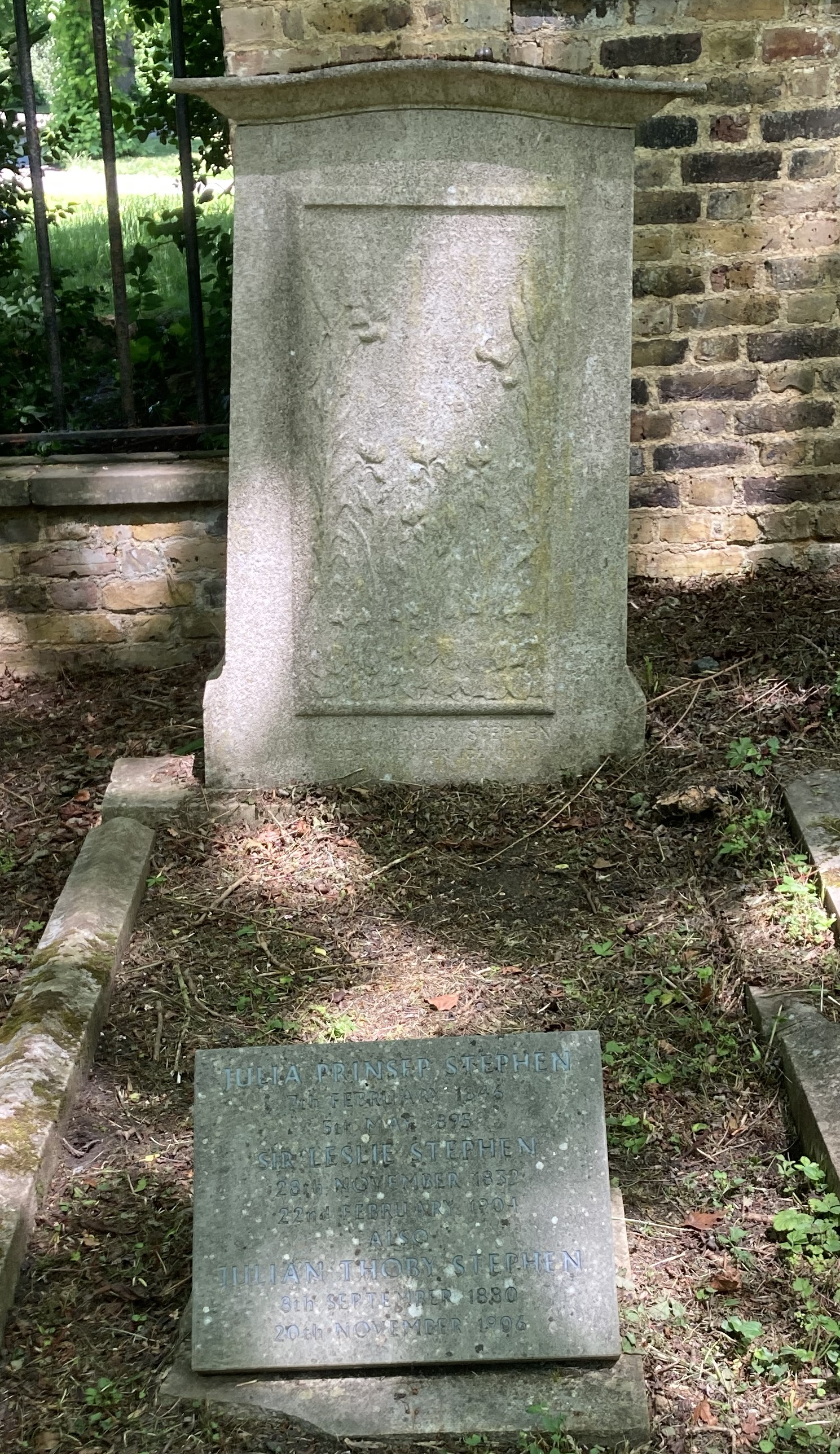
Grave of Sir Leslie Stephen, Julia Stephen and Julian Stephen in Highgate Cemetery

Stephen was educated at Clifton College, after failing to gain a place at Eton. However, this did not hold him back, since he won an exhibition to Trinity College, Cambridge, from Clifton. He was a friend of Lytton Strachey, who was enchanted by his masculinity and introduced him to the "Reading Club". He was described as "over six feet tall and of somewhat ponderous build".

Stephen is credited with starting the Bloomsbury Group's Thursday evening gatherings.

He was expected to distinguish himself, but he contracted typhoid at the age of 26 while on holiday in Greece, and died shortly after he was brought back to England. He is buried in Highgate Cemetery with his father and mother.

Vanessa Bell's eldest son, the poet Julian Bell, was named after him.

He is the basis for the character of Tibby Schlegel in E.M. Forster's 1910 novel Howards End. Virginia Woolf's 1931 novel The Waves is considered by some critics to make significant reference to Thoby Stephen.
