= Bloomsbury Group =

Influential group of associated English writers, intellectuals, philosophers and artists

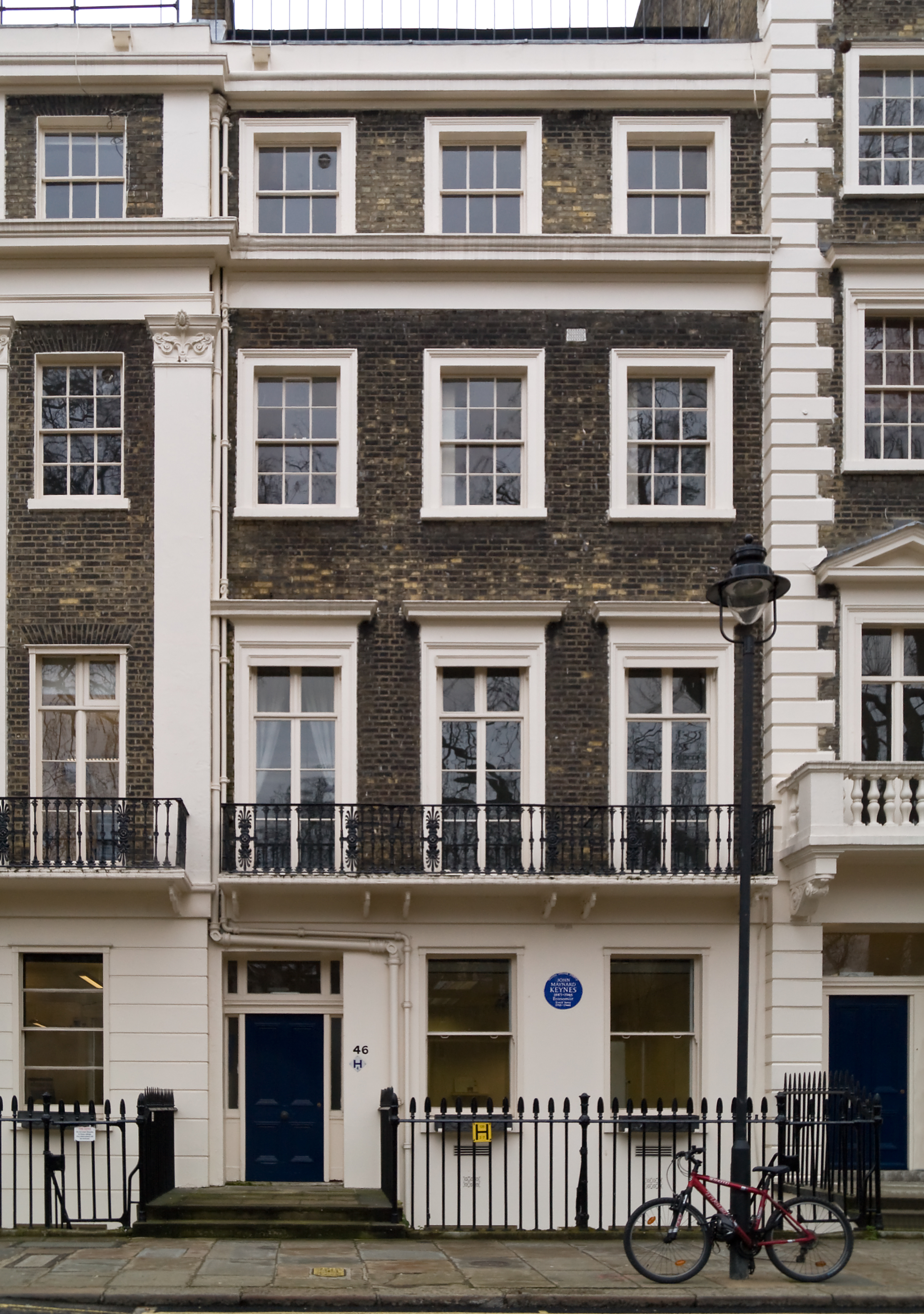
46 Gordon Square, Bloomsbury, London. The economist John Maynard Keynes (1883–1946) lived here from 1916.

The Bloomsbury Group was a group of associated British writers, intellectuals, philosophers and artists in the early 20th century. Among the people involved in the group were Virginia Woolf, John Maynard Keynes, E. M. Forster, Vanessa Bell, and Lytton Strachey. Their works and outlook deeply influenced literature, aesthetics, criticism, and economics, as well as modern attitudes towards feminism, pacifism, and sexuality.

Although popularly thought of as a formal group, it was a loose collective of friends and relatives closely associated with the University of Cambridge for the men and King's College London for the women, who at one point lived, worked or studied together near Bloomsbury, London. According to Ian Ousby, "although its members denied being a group in any formal sense, they were united by an abiding belief in the importance of the arts." The historian Raymond Williams disputed the existence of the group and the extent of its impact.

== Origins ==
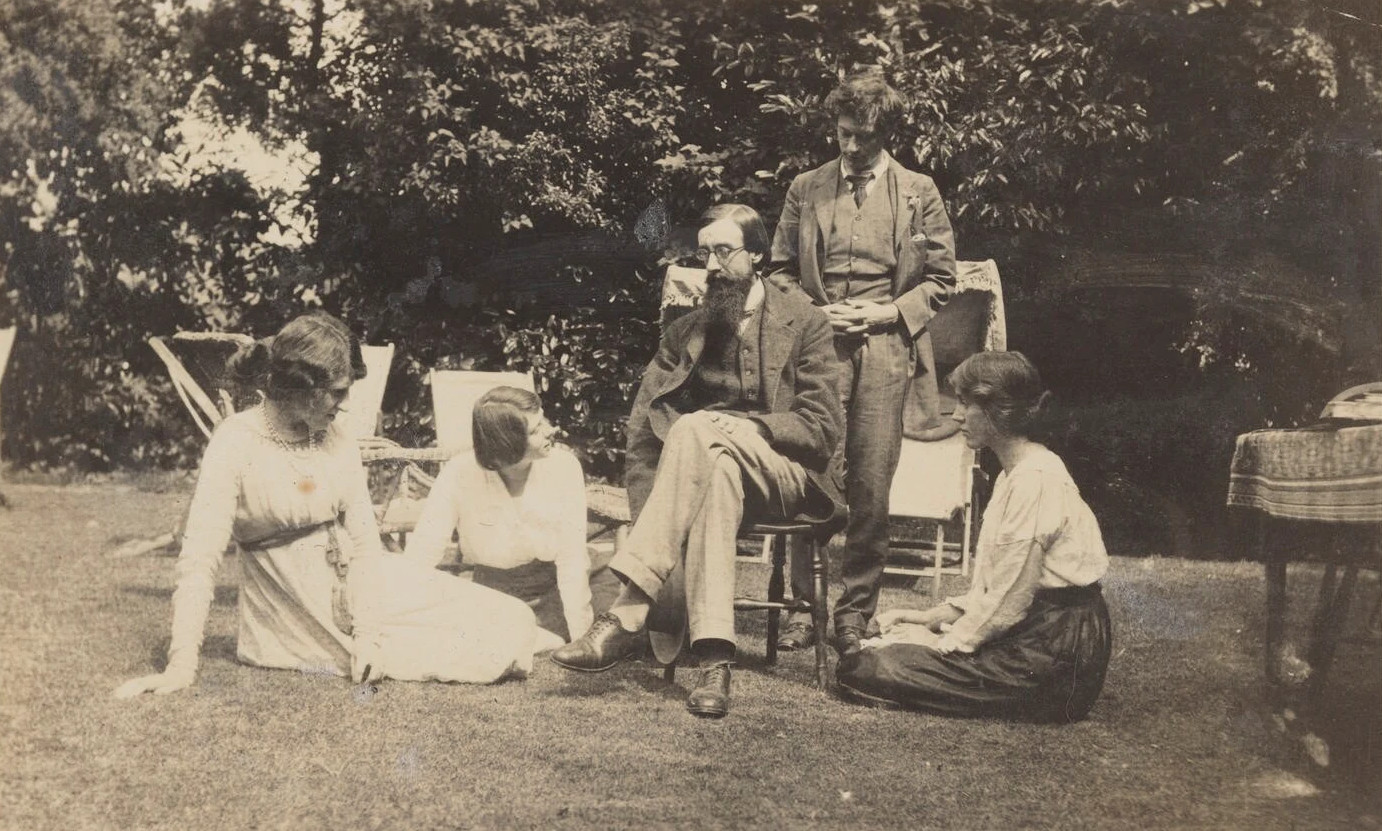
Left to right: Lady Ottoline Morrell, Maria Nys (neither members of Bloomsbury), Lytton Strachey, Duncan Grant, and Vanessa Bell

All male members of the Bloomsbury Group, except Duncan Grant, were educated at Cambridge (either at Trinity or King's College). Most of them, except Clive Bell and the Stephen brothers, were members of "the exclusive Cambridge society, the 'Apostles'". At Trinity in 1899 Lytton Strachey, Leonard Woolf, Saxon Sydney-Turner and Clive Bell became good friends with Thoby Stephen, and it was through Thoby and Adrian Stephen's sisters Vanessa and Virginia that the men met the women of Bloomsbury when they came down to London.

In 1905 Vanessa began the "Friday Club" and Thoby ran "Thursday Evenings", which became the basis for the Bloomsbury Group, which to some was really "Cambridge in London". Thoby's premature death in 1906 brought them more firmly together and they became what is now known as the "Old Bloomsbury" group who met in earnest beginning in 1912. In the 1920s and 1930s the group shifted when the original members died and the next generation had reached adulthood.

The Bloomsbury Group, mostly from upper middle-class professional families, formed part of "an intellectual aristocracy which could trace itself back to the Clapham Sect". It was an informal network of an influential group of artists, art critics, writers and an economist, many of whom lived in the West Central 1 district of London known as Bloomsbury. They were "spiritually" similar to the Clapham group who supported its members' careers: "The Bloomsberries promoted one another's work and careers just as the original Claphamites did, as well as the intervening generations of their grandparents and parents."

A historical feature of these friends and relations is that their close relationships all pre-dated their fame as writers, artists, and thinkers.

== Membership ==
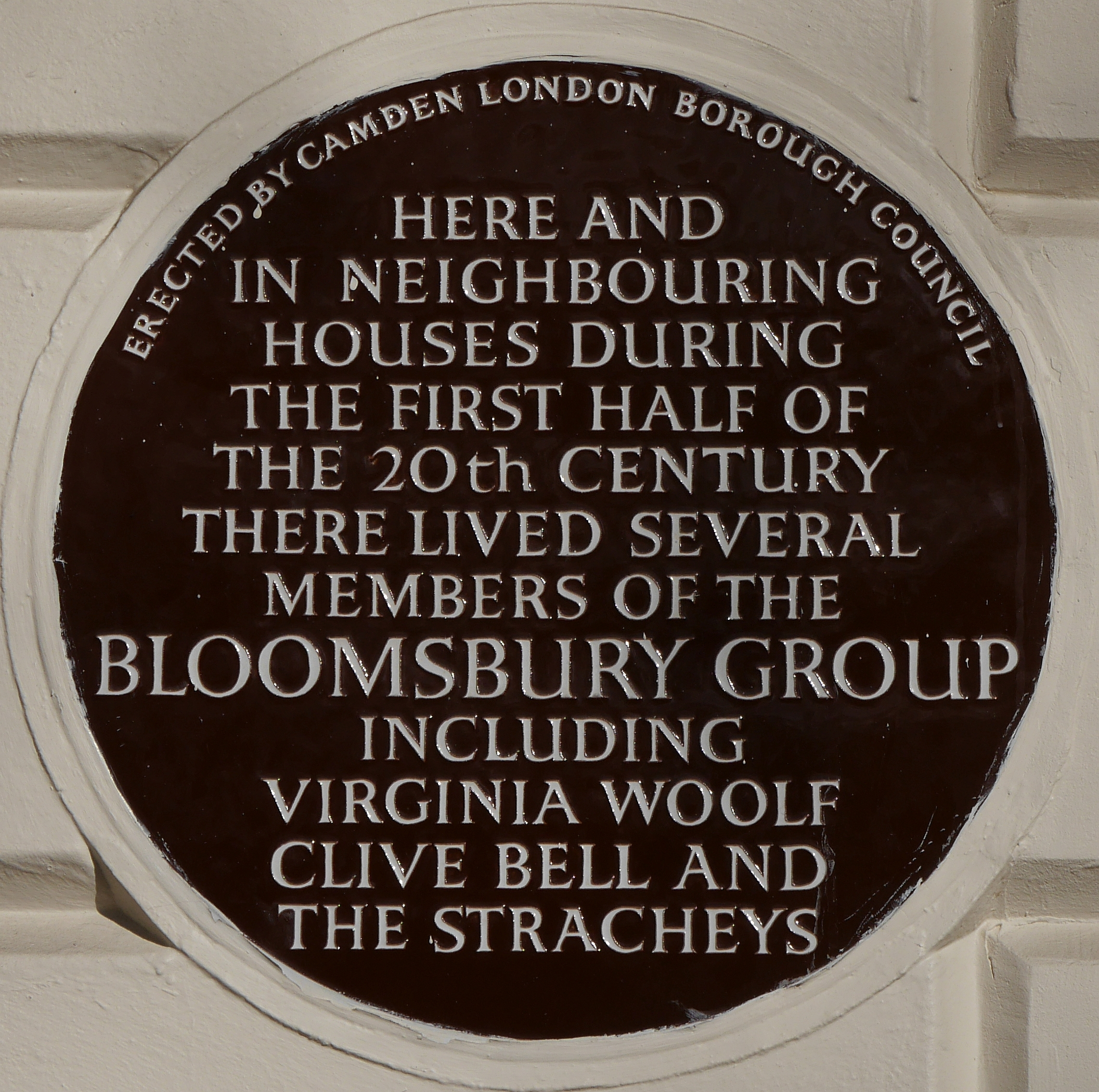
Blue plaque, 50 Gordon Square, London

=== Members ===
The group had ten core members:

- Clive Bell, art critic
- Vanessa Bell, post-impressionist painter
- E. M. Forster, fiction writer
- Roger Fry, art critic and post-impressionist painter
- Duncan Grant, post-impressionist painter
- John Maynard Keynes, economist
- Desmond MacCarthy, literary journalist
- Lytton Strachey, biographer
- Leonard Woolf, essayist and non-fiction writer
- Virginia Woolf, fiction writer and essayist

In addition to these ten, Leonard Woolf, in the 1960s, listed as "Old Bloomsbury" Adrian and Karin Stephen, Saxon Sydney-Turner, and Molly MacCarthy, with Julian Bell, Quentin Bell and Angelica Bell, and David Garnett as "later additions". Except for Forster, who published three novels before the highly successful Howards End in 1910, the group were late developers.

There were stable marriages and varied and complicated affairs among the individual members. Lytton Strachey (Note: Manuscripts and Woodcuts: Visions and Designs from Bloomsbury – Duke University Libraries Digital Collections Includes 12 woodcuts by Roger Fry and the manuscript of Elizabeth and Essex written in Lytton Strachey's hand with 7 miscellaneous manuscript letters.) and his cousin and lover Duncan Grant became close friends of the Stephen sisters, Vanessa Bell and Virginia Woolf. Duncan Grant had affairs with siblings Vanessa Bell and Adrian Stephen, as well as David Garnett, Maynard Keynes, and James Strachey. Clive Bell married Vanessa in 1907, and Leonard Woolf returned from the Ceylon Civil Service to marry Virginia in 1912. Cambridge Apostle friendships brought into the group Desmond MacCarthy, his wife Molly, and E. M. Forster.

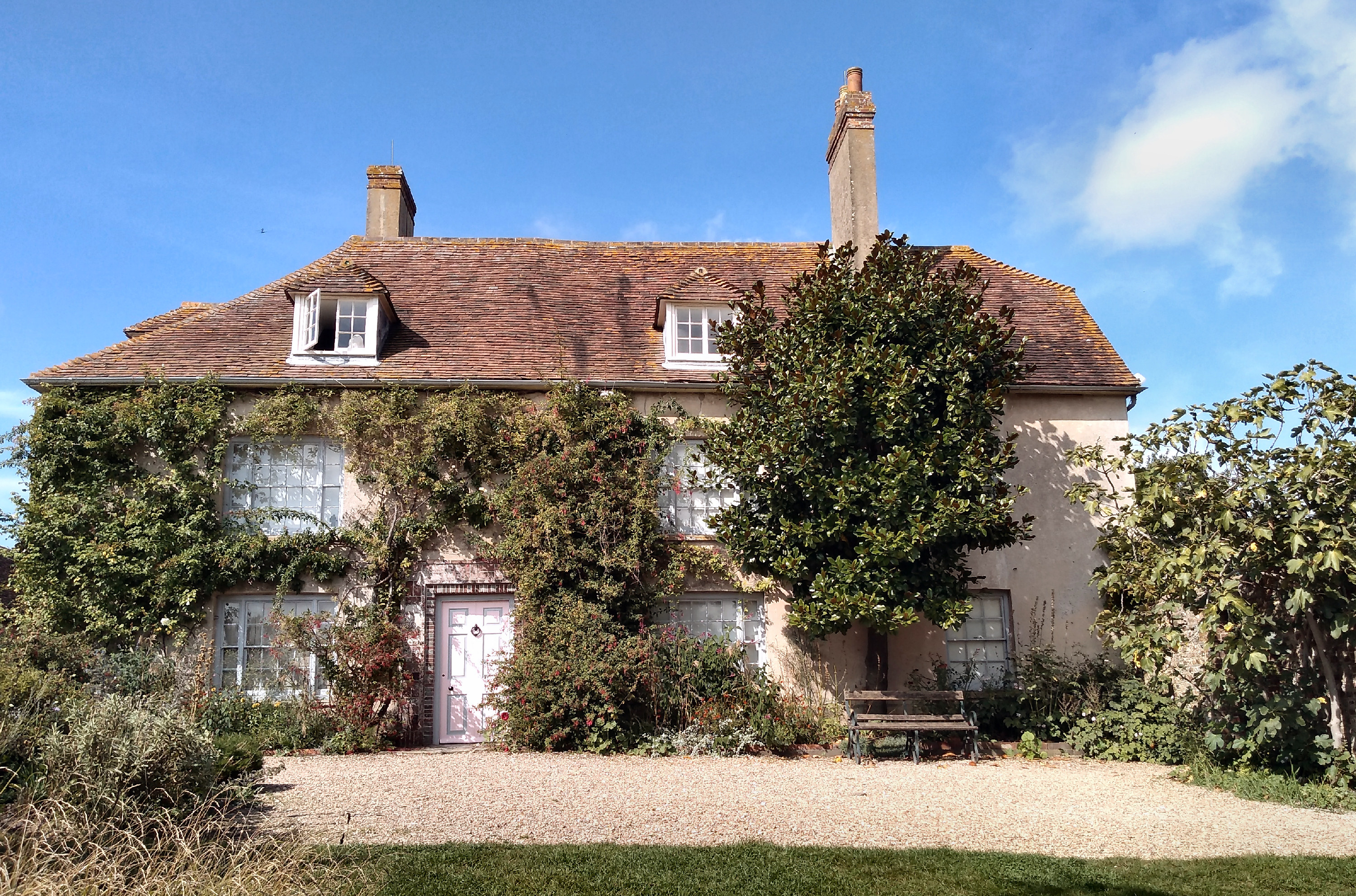
Charleston Farmhouse, where Vanessa Bell and Duncan Grant moved in 1916

The group met not only in their homes in Bloomsbury, central London, but also at countryside retreats. There are two significant ones near Lewes in Sussex: Charleston Farmhouse, (Note: See Charleston House, A Bloomsbury Home and Garden.) where Vanessa Bell and Duncan Grant moved in 1916, and Monk's House (now owned by the National Trust), (Note: Monk's House Photograph albums at Houghton Library, Harvard University: 1863-1938, 1909-1922., 1890-1933, 1890-1947, 1892-1938 and 1850-1900.) in Rodmell, owned by Virginia and Leonard Woolf from 1919.

=== Others ===
Much about Bloomsbury appears to be controversial, including its membership and name: indeed, some would maintain that "the three words 'the Bloomsbury group' have been so much used as to have become almost unusable".

Close friends, brothers, sisters, and even sometimes partners of the friends were not necessarily members of Bloomsbury: Keynes's wife Lydia Lopokova was only reluctantly accepted into the group, and there were certainly "writers who were at some time close friends of Virginia Woolf, but who were distinctly not 'Bloomsbury': T. S. Eliot, Katherine Mansfield, Hugh Walpole". Another is Vita Sackville-West, who became "Hogarth Press's best-selling author". Members cited in "other lists might include Ottoline Morrell, or Dora Carrington, or James and Alix Strachey".

== Shared ideas ==
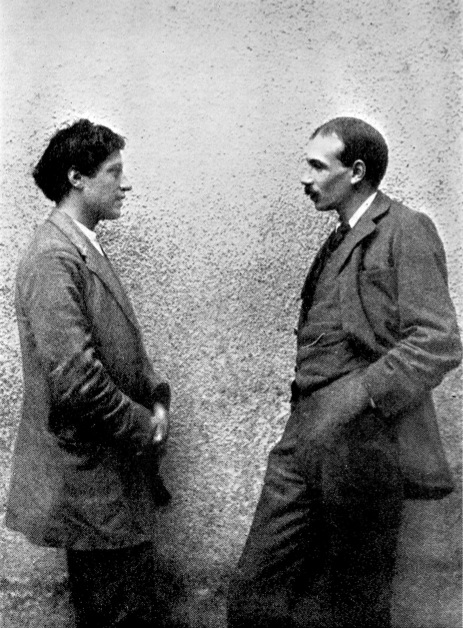
Duncan Grant and John Maynard Keynes c. 1913

The lives and works of the group members show an overlapping, interconnected similarity of ideas and attitudes that helped to keep the friends and relatives together, reflecting in large part the influence of G. E. Moore: "the essence of what Bloomsbury drew from Moore is contained in his statement that 'one's prime objects in life were love, the creation and enjoyment of aesthetic experience and the pursuit of knowledge'".

=== Philosophy and ethics ===
Through the Apostles they also encountered the analytic philosophers G. E. Moore and Bertrand Russell who were revolutionizing British philosophy at the start of the 20th century. Distinguishing between ends and means was a commonplace of ethics, but what made Moore's Principia Ethica (1903) so important for the philosophical basis of Bloomsbury thought was Moore's conception of intrinsic worth as distinct from instrumental value. As with the distinction between love (an intrinsic state) and monogamy (a behavior, i.e. instrumental), Moore's differentiation between intrinsic and instrumental value allowed the Bloomsburies to maintain an ethical high-ground based on intrinsic merit, independent of, and without reference to, the consequences of their actions. For Moore, intrinsic value depended on an indeterminable intuition of good and a concept of complex states of mind whose worth as a whole was not proportionate to the sum of its parts. For both Moore and Bloomsbury, the greatest ethic goods were "the importance of personal relationships and the private life", as well as aesthetic appreciation: "art for art's sake".

=== Rejection of bourgeois habits ===
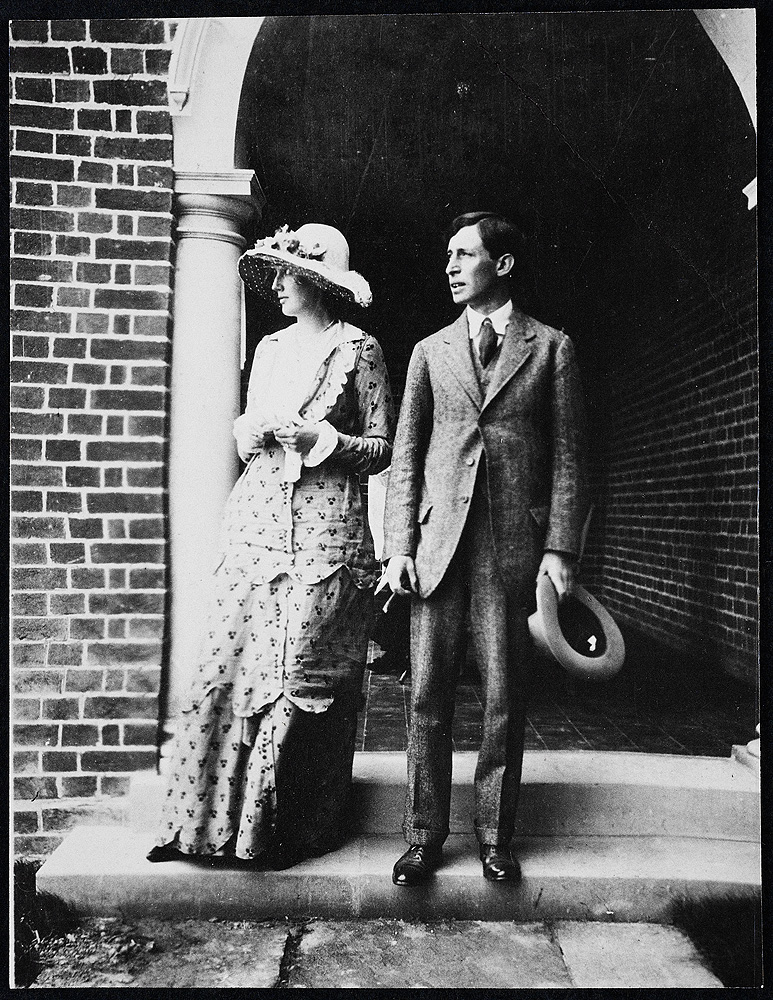
Virginia Woolf and her husband Leonard Woolf in 1912

Bloomsbury reacted against current upper class English social rituals, "the bourgeois habits ... the conventions of Victorian life" with their emphasis on public achievement, in favour of a more informal and private focus on personal relationships and individual pleasure. E. M. Forster for example approved of "the decay of smartness and fashion as factors, and the growth of the idea of enjoyment", and asserted that "if I had to choose between betraying my country and betraying my friend, I hope I should have the guts to betray my country".

The Group "believed in pleasure ... They tried to get the maximum of pleasure out of their personal relations. If this meant triangles or more complicated geometric figures, well then, one accepted that too". Yet at the same time, they shared a sophisticated, civilized, and highly articulated ideal of pleasure. As Virginia Woolf put it, their "triumph is in having worked out a view of life which was not by any means corrupt or sinister or merely intellectual; rather ascetic and austere indeed; which still holds, and keeps them dining together, and staying together, after 20 years".

=== Politics ===
Politically, Bloomsbury held mainly left-liberal stances (opposed to militarism, for example); but its "clubs and meetings were not activist, like the political organisations to which many of Bloomsbury's members also belonged", and they would be criticised for that by their 1930s successors, who by contrast were "heavily touched by the politics which Bloomsbury had rejected".

The campaign for women's suffrage added to the controversial nature of Bloomsbury, as Virginia Woolf represented the group in the fictional The Years and Night and Day works about the suffrage movement.

=== Art ===
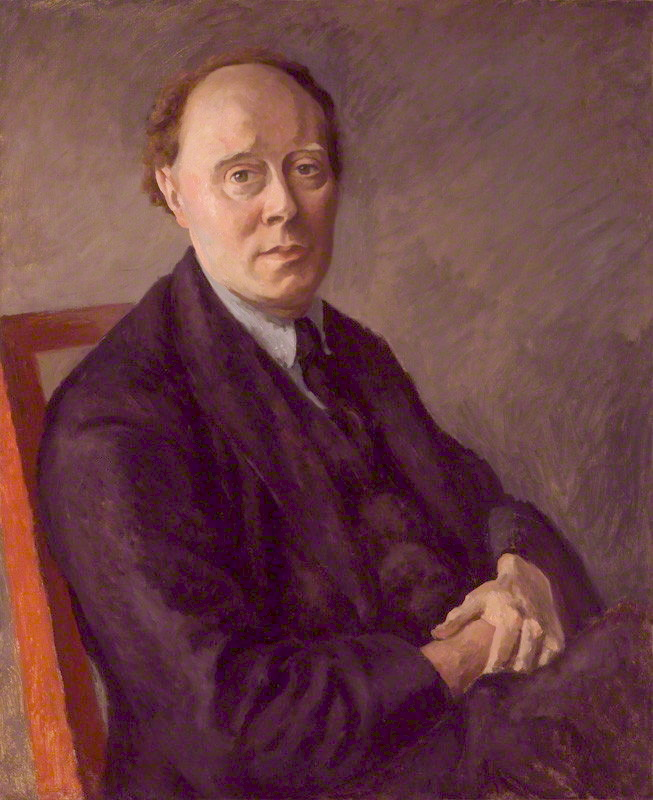
Portrait of Clive Bell by Roger Fry (c. 1924)

Roger Fry joined the group in 1910. His Post-Impressionist exhibitions of 1910 and 1912 involved Bloomsbury in a second revolution following on the Cambridge philosophical one. This time the Bloomsbury painters were much involved and influenced. (Note: Bloomsbury was also part of Fry's extension of post-impressionism into the decorative arts with his Omega Workshops, which lasted until 1920.) Fry and other Bloomsbury artists rejected the traditional distinction between fine and decorative art.

These "Bloomsbury assumptions" are reflected in members' criticisms of materialistic realism in painting and fiction, influenced above all by Clive Bell's "concept of 'Significant Form', which separated and elevated the concept of form above content in works of art": it has been suggested that, with their "focus on form ...Bell's ideas have come to stand in for, perhaps too much so, the aesthetic principles of the Bloomsbury Group".

The establishment's hostility to post-impressionism made Bloomsbury controversial, and controversial they have remained. Clive Bell polemicized post-impressionism in his widely read book Art (1914), basing his aesthetics partly on Roger Fry's art criticism and G. E. Moore's moral philosophy; and as the war came he argued that "in these days of storm and darkness, it seemed right that at the shrine of civilization - in Bloomsbury, I mean - the lamp should be tended assiduously".

=== World War I ===
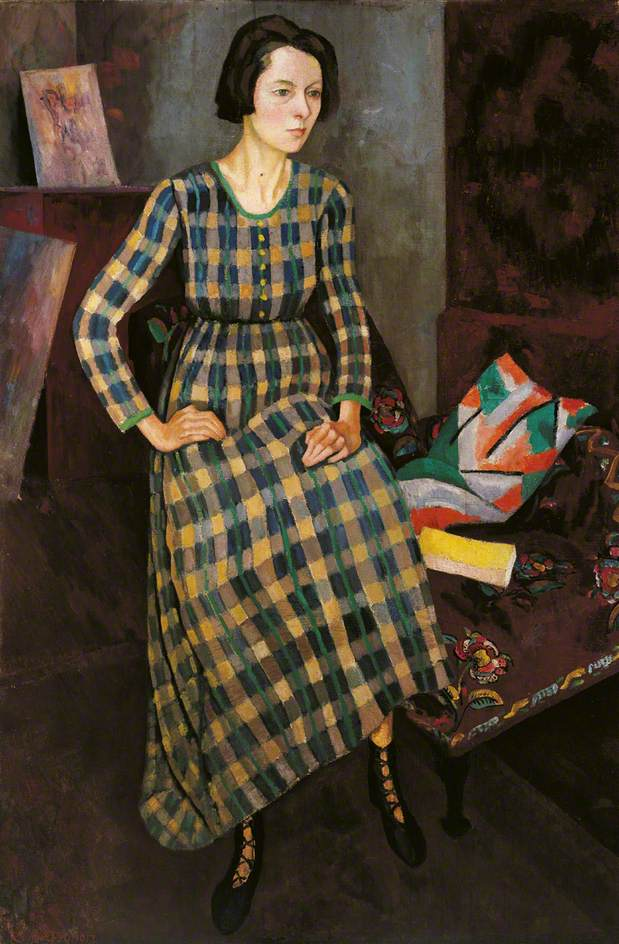
Nina Hamnett painted by Roger Fry, 1917, in a dress designed by Vanessa Bell and made at the Omega Workshops. The shoes may also be from Omega and the cushion on the chair is covered with 'Maud' linen, also by Bell.

Old Bloomsbury's development was affected, along with much of modernist culture, by the First World War: "the small world of Bloomsbury was later said by some on its outskirts to have been irretrievably shattered", though in fact its friendships "survived the upheavals and dislocations of war, in many ways were even strengthened by them". Most but not all of them were conscientious objectors. Politically, the members of Bloomsbury had liberal and socialist leanings.

Though the war dispersed Old Bloomsbury, the individuals continued to develop their careers. E. M. Forster followed his successful novels with Maurice which he could not publish because it treated homosexuality untragically. In 1915, Virginia Woolf brought out her first novel, The Voyage Out; and in 1917 the Woolfs founded their Hogarth Press, which would publish T. S. Eliot, Katherine Mansfield, and many others including Virginia herself along with the standard English translations of Freud. Then in 1918 Lytton Strachey published his critique of Victorianism in the shape of four iconoclastic biographies in Eminent Victorians, which added to the arguments about Bloomsbury that continue to this day, and "brought him the triumph he had always longed for ... The book was a sensation".

The following year came J. M. Keynes's influential attack on the Versailles Peace Treaty: The Economic Consequences of the Peace established Maynard as a prominent economist and political economist of international eminence.

=== Attire ===
Bloomsbury members became known for distinctive garments; Woolf in particular was opposed to conventions surrounding formal attire, such as "dressing for dinner".

== Later Bloomsbury ==
The 1920s were in a number of ways the blooming of Bloomsbury. Virginia Woolf was writing and publishing her most widely-read modernist novels and essays, and E. M. Forster completed A Passage to India (1924), a highly regarded novel on British imperialism in India. Forster wrote no more novels, but he became one of England's most influential essayists. Duncan Grant, and then Vanessa Bell, had single-artist exhibitions. Lytton Strachey wrote his biographies of two queens, Queen Victoria (1921) and Elizabeth and Essex: A Tragic History (1928). Desmond MacCarthy and Leonard Woolf engaged in friendly rivalry as literary editors of the New Statesman and of The Nation and Athenaeum respectively, thus fuelling animosities that saw Bloomsbury dominating the cultural scene. Roger Fry wrote and lectured widely on art; meanwhile, Clive Bell applied Bloomsbury values to his book Civilization (1928), which Leonard Woolf saw as limited and elitist, describing Bell as a "wonderful organiser of intellectual greyhound racing tracks".

In the darkening 1930s, Bloomsbury began to die: "Bloomsbury itself was hardly any longer a focus". Shortly after publishing a collection of brief lives, Portraits in Miniature (1931), Lytton Strachey died in January 1932; subsequently Carrington shot herself (March 1932). Roger Fry died in 1934. Vanessa and Clive's eldest son, Julian Bell, was killed in 1937 during the Spanish Civil War. Virginia Woolf wrote Fry's biography, but with the coming of war again her mental instability recurred, and she drowned herself in 1941. In the previous decade she had become one of the century's most famous feminist writers with three more novels, and a series of essays including the moving late memoir "A Sketch of the Past" (1939). It was also in the 1930s that Desmond MacCarthy became perhaps the most widely read—and heard—literary critic with his columns in The Sunday Times and his broadcasts for the BBC. John Maynard Keynes's The General Theory of Employment, Interest, and Money (1936) made him one of the century's most influential economists. He died in 1946 after being much involved in monetary negotiations with the United States.

The diversity yet collectivity of Later Bloomsbury's ideas and achievements can be summed up in a series of credos produced in 1938, the year of the Munich Agreement. Virginia Woolf published her radical feminist polemic Three Guineas that shocked some of her fellow members, including Keynes who had enjoyed the gentler A Room of One's Own (1929). Keynes read his My Early Beliefs to The Memoir Club. Clive Bell published an appeasement pamphlet (he later supported the war), and E. M. Forster wrote an early version of his famous essay "What I Believe" with its choice of personal relations over patriotism: his quiet assertion in the face of the increasingly totalitarian claims of both left and right that "personal relations ... love and loyalty to an individual can run counter to the claims of the State".

== Memoir Club ==
In March 1920 Molly MacCarthy began the Memoir Club to help Desmond and herself write their memoirs; and also "for their friends to regroup after the war (with the proviso that they should always tell the truth)". It met until 1956 or 1964. The club was made up of members of the Bloomsbury Group, a loose collective of artists, writers, intellectuals, and philosophers.

== Criticism ==
Early complaints focused on a perceived cliquiness: "on personal mannerisms—the favourite phrases ('ex-quisitely civilized', and 'How simply too extraordinary!'), the incredulous, weirdly emphasised Strachey voice". After World War I, as the members of the Group "began to be famous, the execration increased, and the caricature of an idle, snobbish and self-congratulatory rentier class, promoting its own brand of high culture began to take shape": as Forster self-mockingly put it, "In came the nice fat dividends, up rose the lofty thoughts".

The growing threats of the 1930s brought new criticism from younger writers of "what the last lot had done (Bloomsbury, Modernism, Eliot) in favour of what they thought of as urgent hard-hitting realism"; while "Wyndham Lewis's The Apes of God, which called Bloomsbury élitist, corrupt and talentless, caused a stir" of its own. The most telling criticism, however, came perhaps from within the Group's own ranks, when on the eve of war Keynes gave a "nostalgic and disillusioned account of the pure sweet air of G. E. Moore, that belief in undisturbed individualism, that Utopianism based on a belief in human reasonableness and decency, that refusal to accept the idea of civilisation as 'a thin and precarious crust' ... Keynes's fond, elegiac repudiation of his "early beliefs", in the light of current affairs ("We completely misunderstood human nature, including our own")".

In his book on the background of the Cambridge spies, Andrew Sinclair wrote about the Bloomsbury group: "rarely in the field of human endeavour has so much been written about so few who achieved so little". American philosopher Martha Nussbaum was quoted in 1999 as saying "I don't like anything that sets itself up as an in-group or an elite, whether it is the Bloomsbury group or Derrida".

Raymond Williams saw Bloomsbury as the invention of an ageing and lonely Leonard Woolf, seeking to lift himself and his friends from obscurity. To Williams, the only two so-called "members" of any significance in their respective fields were Keynes and Virginia Woolf. Williams unfavourably compared the Bloomsbury Group to the Pre-Raphaelite Brotherhood and Arts and Crafts movement, finding that the older groups were more radical and consequential.

== See also ==
- Arthur Waley
- Bloomsbury Group in LGBT history
- Dreadnought hoax
- Generation Gap
- Heterosociality
- LGBT social movements
- Lost Generation
- Opposition to World War I
- Roy Campbell, who attacked the group in The Georgiad (1931)

== Bibliography ==
- Avery, Todd. Radio Modernism: Literature, Ethics, and the BBC, 1922–1938. Ashgate Publishing, Ltd.; 1 January 2006. ISBN 978-0-7546-5517-6.
- Bénézit, Emmanuel (editor). Bénézit Dictionary of British Graphic Artists and Illustrators. Oxford University Press; 21 June 2012. ISBN 978-0-19-992305-2.
- Blythe, Ronald. in David Daiches ed., The Penguin Companion to Literature I. Penguin, 1971.
- Clarke, Peter. Keynes. Bloomsbury Press, 2009. pp. 56, 57. ISBN 978-1-60819-023-2.
- Edel, Leon. Bloomsbury: A House of Lions, Hogarth Press, 1979
- Fargis, Paul. The New York Public Library Desk Reference – 3rd Edition. Macmillan General Reference, 1998. p. 262. ISBN 0-02-862169-7.
- Forster, E. M.. Two Cheers for Democracy. Penguin, 1965.
- Gadd, David. The Loving Friends: A Portrait of Bloomsbury London: The Hogarth Press Ltd, 1974.
- Head, Dominic. The Cambridge Guide to Literature in English. Cambridge University Press; 26 January 2006. ISBN 978-0-521-83179-6.
- Knights, Sarah. Bloomsbury's Outsider: A Life of David Garnett, Bloomsbury Reader, Paperback and Digital, 15 May 2015, ISBN 978-1-4482-1545-4
- Koppen, Randi. Virginia Woolf, Fashion and Literary Modernity. Edinburgh University Press; 2009. ISBN 978-0-7486-3872-7.
- Kuper, Adam. Incest and Influence: The Private Life of Bourgeois England. Harvard University Press; 28 February 2010. ISBN 978-0-674-05414-1.
- Lee, Hermione. Virginia Woolf London: Chatto & Windus, 1996.
- Ousby, Ian ed., The Cambridge Guide to Literature in English (Cambridge 1995)
- Rosenbaum, Stanford Patrick. The Bloomsbury Group: A Collection of Memoirs and Commentary. University of Toronto Press; 1995. ISBN 978-0-8020-7640-3 Also published by Croom Helm, London; 1995 ISBN 085664-285-1.
- Snow, C. P.. Last Things. Penguin, 1974.
- Spalding, Frances. Virginia Woolf: Paper Darts: the Illustrated Letters (1991)
- Tate. Bloomsbury Group Timeline. Archive Journeys: Bloomsbury Group. Tate.
- Tew, P. and Murray, A.. The Modernist Handbook 2009.
