= Adrian Stephen =

English author and psychoanalyst (1883-1948)

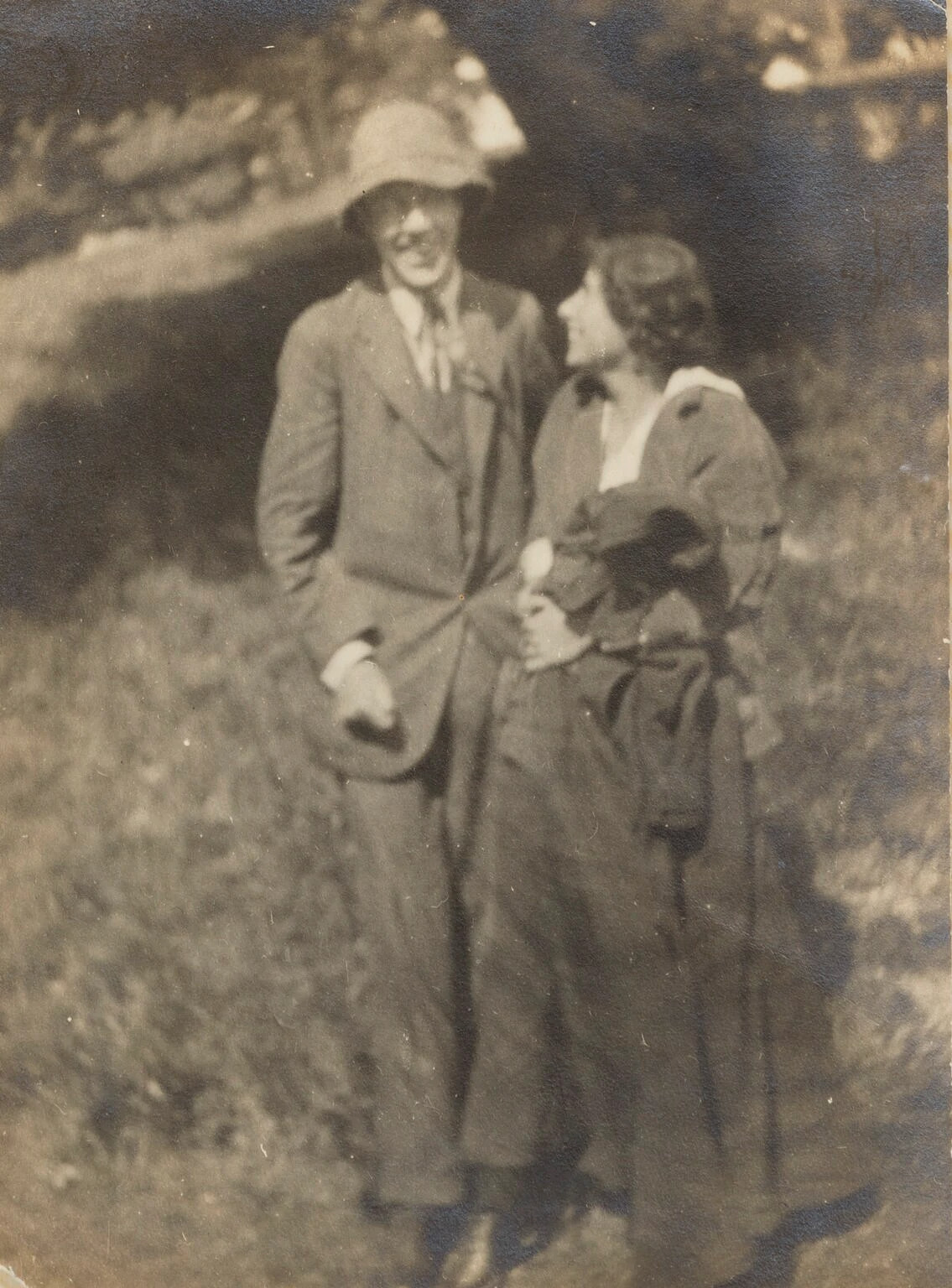
Adrian and Karin Stephen 1914

Adrian Leslie Stephen (27 October 1883 – 3 May 1948) was an English author and psychoanalyst who was a member of the Bloomsbury Group and the younger brother of Thoby Stephen, Virginia Woolf and Vanessa Bell. He and his wife, Karin, became interested in the work of Sigmund Freud, and were among the first British psychoanalysts.

== Life ==
Stephen was born in 1883, the youngest of four children of Julia and Leslie Stephen; their father's death in 1904 resulted in the four siblings moving to Bloomsbury, and their house there became the nucleus of the Bloomsbury Group. By his mother's first marriage, he was also a half-brother of George and Gerald Duckworth. He was educated at Westminster School.

Among his romantic liaisons was his affair with the artist Duncan Grant, which led to Grant's introduction to Stephen's sister Vanessa Bell, with whom he would eventually have a (rather unusual) romance. Adrian attended Trinity College, Cambridge, where he took an Ordinary Degree in law and history. In 1914 Stephen married Karin Costelloe, a philosophy graduate, by then Fellow of Newnham College and expert on Henri Bergson. The couple had two daughters Ann and Judith Stephen.

On the introduction of conscription in 1916 during the First World War Stephen became a conscientious objector, like many other members of the Bloomsbury Group, and, with Costelloe, lived out the remainder of the war working on a farm in Essex. Early in the war he was active in the Union of Democratic Control, then later was Honorary Treasurer of the National Council Against Conscription. Towards the end of the war, Adrian, Karin, James and Alix Strachey all became interested in psychoanalysis. The Stephens trained medically at the request of Ernest Jones, both being analysed initially by James Glover; they qualified in the late 1920s, Adrian completing his analysis with Ella Freeman Sharpe.

In 1936, Stephen decided to recount in detail the Dreadnought hoax, in which he had taken part a quarter of a century earlier, completing an account published by the Hogarth Press. He also became deeply involved in anti-Fascist activity in the Thirties. In World War II Stephen became so angered by the Nazis' brutality and antisemitism that he abandoned his pacifist stance of the previous war and volunteered to become an army psychoanalyst in 1939, at the age of 57. Active in promoting reforms in the British Psychoanalytical Society in 1942–44 during the Controversial Discussions, he became Scientific Secretary of the Society (1945–47) and took over the job of Editor of the International Journal of Psychoanalysis from James Strachey in 1946. He died in 1948.

== List of selected publications ==
- The 'Dreadnought' Hoax (1936)

== See also ==
- Melanie Klein

== Bibliography ==
- MacGibbon, Jean (1997). There's the Lighthouse: A Biography of Adrian Stephen. James & James. ISBN 978-0-907383-76-5.
- Dawley, Janice E. "The Bloomsbury Group: Adrian Stephen". Time and Tide.
