= Jacob Epstein =

American and British sculptor (1880–1959)

Sir Jacob Epstein KBE
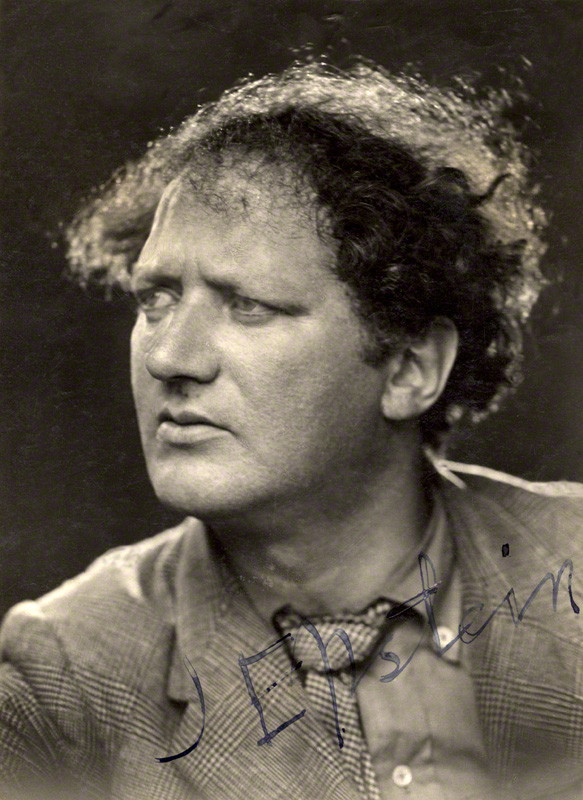
- 1921 photograph by George Charles Beresford
- Born: 10 November 1880; New York City, US
- Died: 21 August 1959 (aged 78); London, England
- Citizenship: United States; British subject (from 1910)
- Education: Art Students League of New York; Académie Julian; École des Beaux-Arts
- Known for: Sculpture
- Spouses: Margaret Dunlop (m. 1906; died 1947); Kathleen Garman (m. 1955)
- Children: 5, including Theodore and Kathleen

Sir Jacob Epstein KBE (/ˈɛpstaɪn/, 10 November 1880 – 21 August 1959) was an American and British sculptor who helped pioneer modern sculpture. He was born in the United States, and moved to Europe in 1902, becoming a British subject in 1910.

Early in his career, in 1912, The Pall Mall Gazette described Epstein as "a Sculptor in Revolt, who is in deadly conflict with the ideas of current sculpture." Revolting against ornate, pretty art, he made bold, often harsh and massive forms in bronze or stone. His sculpture is distinguished by its vigorous rough-hewn realism. Avant-garde in concept and style, his works often shocked audiences. This was not only a result of their often explicit sexual content, but also because they abandoned the conventions of classical Greek sculpture favoured by European academic critics and sculptors, to experiment instead with the aesthetics of art traditions as diverse as those of India, China, ancient Greece, West Africa, and the Pacific Islands. His larger sculptures were his most expressive and experimental, but also his most vulnerable.

Such factors may have focused disproportionate attention on certain aspects of Epstein's long and productive career, throughout which he aroused hostility, especially when violating taboos surrounding the depiction of sexuality. He often produced controversial works that challenged ideas on what was appropriate subject matter for public artworks. Epstein would often sculpt the images of friends, casual acquaintances, and even people he spotted on the street. He worked even on his dying day. He also painted; many of his watercolours and gouaches were of Epping Forest, where he lived for a time. These were often exhibited at the Leicester Galleries in London.

Bronze portrait sculpture formed one of Epstein's staple products, and perhaps the best known. These sculptures were often executed with roughly textured surfaces, expressively manipulating small surface planes and facial details.

Epstein was Jewish, and negative reviews of his work sometimes took on an antisemitic flavour, though he did not attribute the "average unfavorable criticism" of his work to antisemitism.

After Epstein died, Henry Moore wrote a tribute in The Sunday Times which included a recognition of Epstein's central role in the development of modern sculpture in Britain. "He took the brickbats, he took the insults, he faced the howls of derision with which artists since Rembrandt have learned to become familiar. And as far as sculpture in this century is concerned he took them first.... We have lost a great sculptor and a great man."

== Biography ==
=== Early life and education ===
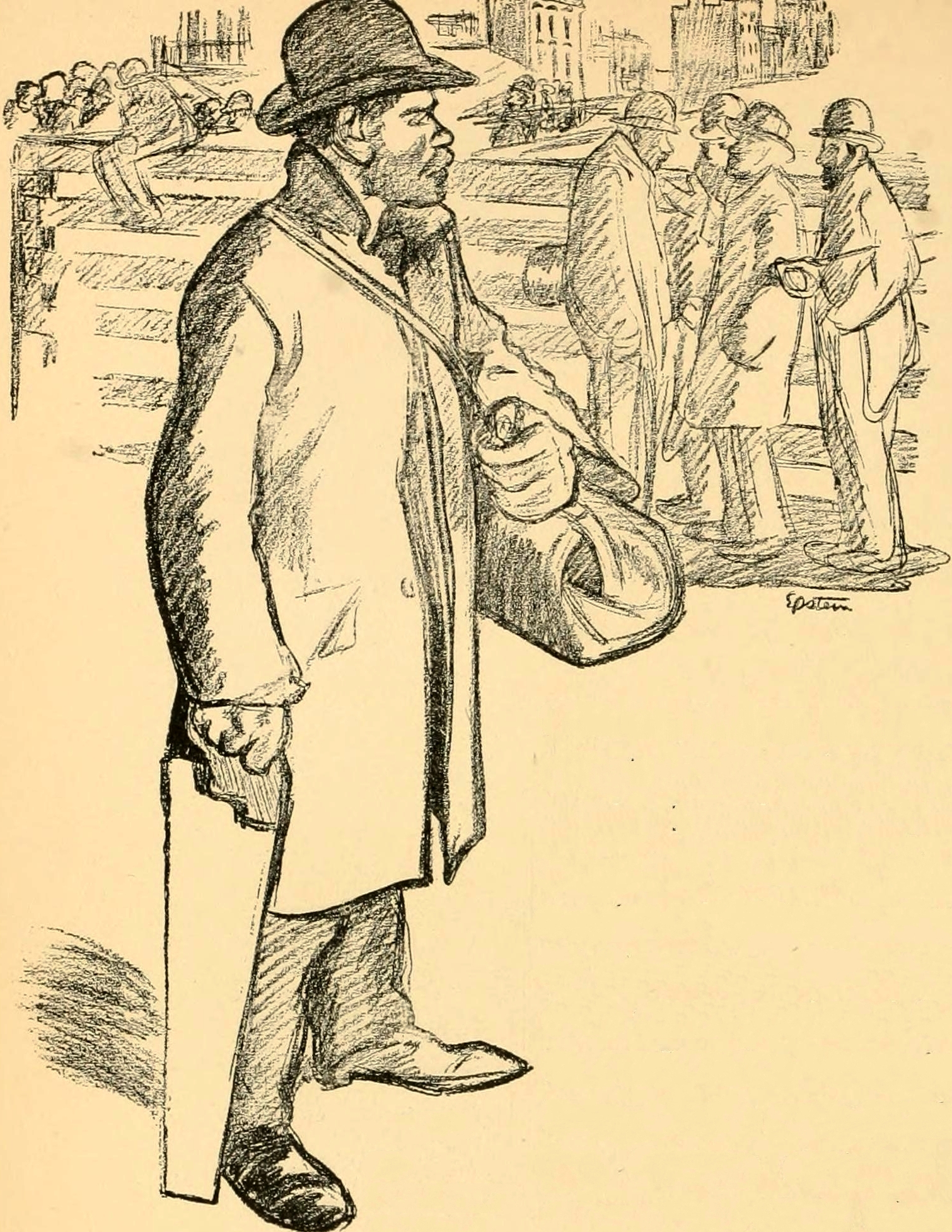
A type of a laboring man from The Spirit of the Ghetto, 1902

Epstein was born at 102 Hester Street on the Lower East Side of New York City. His parents were Max Epstein, formerly Jarogenski or Jarudzinski, and Mary Epstein, née Solomon, both of whom were Orthodox Jews and whose families had emigrated from Augustów in Poland. The family was middle-class, owning a number of businesses and tenements, and Jacob was the third of their eight surviving children.

As a child Epstein suffered from pleurisy and he left school aged thirteen. Between 1893 and 1898 he attended classes at the Art Students League of New York. In 1898 he organised an exhibition at the Hebrew Institute for a group of local Jewish artists and in 1899 opted to stay at Hester Street when his family moved to Madison Avenue, supporting himself by working as a tenement inspector and, briefly, as a physical education instructor. He also began selling his drawings and provided illustrations for two articles by the journalist Hutchins Hapgood. Epstein spent the winter of 1899 working as an ice-cutter with his friend Bernard Gussrow at Greenwood Lake in New Jersey.

In 1900, the Hester Street tenement Epstein was living in burnt down and, as well as losing all his sketches and drawings, he became homeless. With the help of the local settlement movement he took a job as a farmhand in Southboro, Massachusetts. Returning to Manhattan in June 1901 he worked in a bronze foundry while taking classes for sculptor's assistants at the Art Students League of New York. Epstein's first major commission was to illustrate Hutchins Hapgood's 1902 book The Spirit of the Ghetto. Epstein used the money from the commission to leave New York City for Paris in September 1902.

=== Paris 1902–1905 ===
On his second full day in Paris, during October 1902, Epstein saw the funeral procession of Emile Zola and witnessed some of the anti-semitic abuse directed at the passing cortège. Epstein studied at the École des Beaux-Arts from October 1902 until March 1903 and then, from April 1903 to 1904, at the Académie Julian where he was taught by Jean-Paul Laurens. He shared a studio in Montparnasse with Bernard Gussrow and throughout 1904 and 1905 appears to have studied independently in various Paris museums. He regularly visited the Louvre to view its collection of non-European sculpture, studied Indian and Far Eastern art in the Musée Guimet and artworks from China in the Musée Cernuschi.

Epstein visited Rodin in his studio and met Margaret Dunlop, known as Peggy, (1873-1947) who encouraged him to visit London, which he did in 1904. There he spent some time viewing sculptures from African and Polynesian cultures in the British Museum, all of which were to have a profound influence on his future work.

=== London 1905–1907 ===
After destroying the contents of his Paris studio, Epstein moved to London in 1905 with Dunlop, whom he married in November 1906. The couple lived at Stanhope Street near Regent's Park before moving to the Stamford Street Studios in Fulham. With a reference from Rodin, Epstein gained access to a number of society figures, notably George Bernard Shaw and Robbie Ross and to a circle of artists associated with the New English Art Club, NEAC, including Muirhead Bone and Augustus John. He had a wax model shown in a large exhibition of Jewish art at the Whitechapel Art Gallery during 1906 and an oil painting included in the NEAC's December 1906 show. In 1907, Epstein moved his studio to 72 Cheyne Walk where he began working on his first major public commission, a series of statues for the new British Medical Association building in London.

=== The Strand sculptures, 1908 ===
Throughout 1907 and 1908, Epstein created eighteen large sculptures for the second-floor façade of Charles Holden's new building for the British Medical Association, BMA, on The Strand (now Zimbabwe House) in central London. Epstein created models of each figure in his studio and these were then cast in plaster. The plaster models were taken to the Strand where they were copied in stone by a firm of commercial architectural carvers, John Drymond of Westminster Bridge Road. Epstein then made minor adjustments and changes to the stone figures. This process of using models, casts and commercial carvers was the norm for architectural sculpture at the time and was one Epstein soon came to reject.

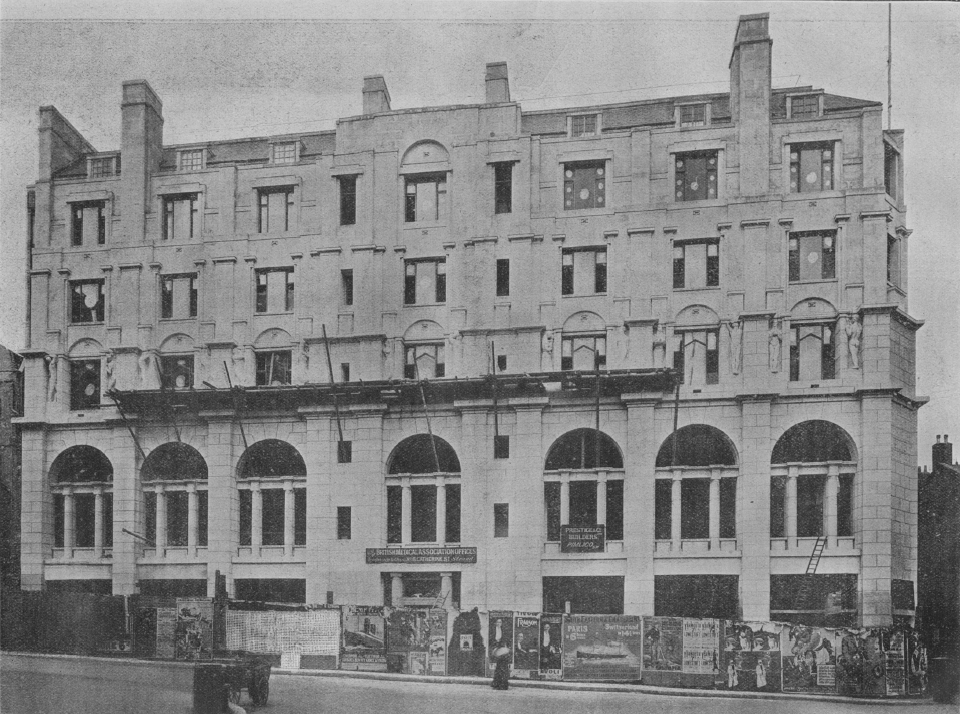
BMA Building July 1908 Agar Street Elevation

Although the six figures representing aspects of medicine and science attracted little attention, the twelve statues representing different stages of life were greatly criticised, notably by the National Vigilance Association whose offices were opposite the building. Their view that the figures, particularly that of the heavily pregnant Maternity and the male nudes, were sexually explicit and insulting to Edwardian sensibilities was taken up by various newspapers. In June 1908 the London Evening Standard described the sculptures as "statuary which no careful father would wish his daughter, or no discriminating young man his fiancée to see." A police officer was called to climb the scaffolding to inspect the statues as was the Bishop of Stepney, Cosmo Gordon Lang, who approved of them. Several other public figures and artists defended the works and, at a meeting of its governing council in July 1908, the BMA agreed to keep them in place.

In art-historical terms, the Strand sculptures represented Epstein's first thoroughgoing attempt to break away from traditional European iconography in favour of elements derived from classical India sculpture. The female figures in particular incorporated the posture and hand gestures of Buddhist, Jain and Hindu art from the subcontinent.

While working on the Strand statues, Epstein was asked by Augustus John to create a portrait of his two-year-old son, Romilly. This 1907 bronze Romilly John became the first of a series of such portraits of the child. In 1909, Epstein carved a stone version that he retained for the rest of his life. The 1908 controversy over the Strand statues left Epstein depressed and short of money. For the rest of 1908 he worked on portraits and small pieces, notably busts of Euphemia Lamb and his first portrait bust of Mary McEvoy.

=== The Tomb of Oscar Wilde, 1908–1912 ===
Near the end of 1908, without any prior discussion or advance warning, Robbie Ross announced that Epstein was the chosen sculptor for a new tomb of Oscar Wilde in the Père Lachaise Cemetery, Paris. After a period spent studying Wilde's writings, Epstein designed a monument featuring a large statue of Narcissus. After several months, he changed his mind and destroyed the almost complete work in favour of a new design carved directly in stone. The decision to carve directly in stone, then a new and radical departure for contemporary sculptors, may reflect the influence of Epstein's then friend and collaborator Eric Gill. Throughout the second half of 1910, Epstein and Gill met on an almost daily basis, but eventually fell out. Earlier that year they had held long discussions with other artists, including Augustus John and Ambrose McEvoy, about the formation of a religious brotherhood. They also planned the construction on the Sussex Downs of a colossal monument to art, which Gill referred to "as a sort of twentieth-century Stonehenge." During the time they worked together, both Epstein and Gill produced significant works on similar themes, notably Epstein's Sun God and Gill's Cocky Kid and they both carved portrait heads of Romilly John. Epstein's third Romilly John head, entitled Rom, was carved from a rectangular limestone block, which he retained, complete with chisel-marks, as a base for the child's head, so that it appeared as if the figure had emerged from the rock. Both Rom, and another carving called Sun Goddess, show the influence of Oriental and Egyptian art on Epstein and how far he was moving away from more classical and accepted traditions of sculpture. Epstein spent nine months in Gill's studio at Ditchling carving, from a block of Hopton Wood Stone, the new design for Wilde's tomb and for which Gill designed the inscription. This design was clearly influenced by the massive Assyrian sculptures Epstein knew from the British Museum and featured, in his words "a vast, winged figure ... the conception of poet as messenger" with smaller figures representing Fame, Intellectual Pride and Luxury. In June 1912, Epstein had the completed tomb displayed in his London studio for public viewing. The work received positive reviews and was highly praised in the British press, including by publications that had been critical of the Strand statues.

Following an introduction from Augustus John in 1910, John Quinn, a wealthy American collector and patron to the modernists, visited Epstein's studio to view the Wilde tomb and quickly became the artist's major patron and a collector of his work. After his death in 1924, several of Quinn's Epsteins were acquired by public collections in the United States.

By September 1912, after a prolonged dispute with the French customs authorities over the import duty payable, Wilde's tomb was installed in the Père Lachaise Cemetery. The Paris authorities deemed the monument offensive due to the flying creature's testicles and had it covered with a tarpaulin. They demanded that Epstein remove the offending parts or cover them up. He refused and on several occasions visited the cemetery and, with the help of friends including Nina Hamnett and Brancusi, removed the tarpaulin only for the cemetery authorities to replace it later. This standoff, with Epstein travelling between London and Paris on a frequent basis, continued until August 1914 when Robbie Ross, against Epstein's wishes, had a butterfly-shaped plaque made as a fig-leaf to cover the creature's testicles. Epstein refused to attend the official unveiling, which was performed by Aleister Crowley. Crowley subsequently presented Epstein with the fig-leaf from the tomb one evening at the Café Royal in London.

During his time in Paris defending the Wilde tomb, as well as Brancusi, Epstein met and befriended Modigliani and Picasso, each of whom influenced his future work. In May and June 1912, Epstein was among the artists hired to produce artworks for a new London nightclub, The Cave of the Golden Calf, which brought him into contact with a number of younger artists, notably Wyndham Lewis and the poet T. E. Hulme. This led to Epstein becoming associated with the short-lived Vorticism movement and contributing two illustrations to the first edition of the Vorticist magazine Blast.

=== Pett Level 1913–1916 ===
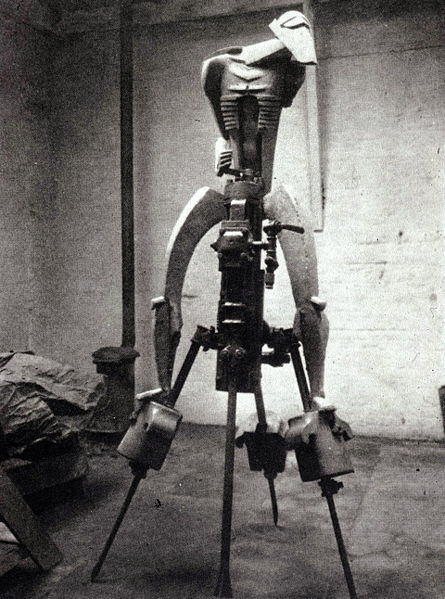
Epstein's 1913 sculpture Rock Drill in its original form

Early in 1913, after living in rented rooms in Montparnasse for three months, the Epsteins moved to a secluded bungalow in the village of Pett Level in East Sussex. Using the garden shed there as a studio, over the next three years Epstein produced a number of notable works.

At Pett Level, Epstein became aware of the dark green mineral Serpentinite, which he called Flenite, and used it for sculptures, including Flenite Women and Flenite Relief, which showed an infant emerging from the womb. He carved two figures of pregnant women, one of which was eventually acquired by the Tate. Cursed Be the Day wherein I was Born was the plaster figure of a child, painted red, apparently crying or screaming. He created three marble sculptures of pairs of doves mating, the first two of which were shown in group exhibitions during 1913 and at his solo exhibition at the Twenty-One Gallery in December 1913. The reviews of all these works, in both the popular press and the art journals, were almost universally hostile and insulting to Epstein.

In London, Epstein rented a room above a bookshop in Devonshire Street and used a garage in the adjacent mews to began work on Rock Drill, which was too large for the Pett Level shed. By the summer of 1914 he was close to completing the work but could not afford to have it cast in steel and made the upper figure in plaster instead.

=== World War I ===
The start of World War I in 1914 saw the closure of a number of London art galleries and left Epstein in financial difficulties, unable to sell any work and with a large number of unfinished pieces. In March 1915, at a London Group exhibition at the Goupil Gallery, Epstein exhibited several works, including the Flenite pieces, Doves and for the first and only time in public, Rock Drill. By making an actual, unaltered, industrial drill an integral part of the sculpture, Epstein must have expected criticism. The menacing body mounted on the drill appeared to be assembled from machine parts, including a head on a shaft with the only organic feature the fetus within the creature's open rib-cage. The critical response was almost universally hostile and abusive. P.G. Konody described Rock Drill as "unutterably loathsome" and Augustus John persuaded John Quinn not to buy it. Even the supportive reviewer for The Guardian concluded that the 'incongruity' of the work was 'too difficult for the mind to grasp'. In May 1916, Epstein, apparently mortified at the slaughter of the war, made the decision to break up the sculpture. He removed the drill and reduced the upper figure to a legless one-armed torso, which he had cast in gunmetal. When shown at the London Group in the summer of 1916, the torso appeared more of a victim than the menacing figure of the original sculpture. At this point Epstein began to concentrate less on avant-garde sculpture and embrace more figurative forms of working.

Later in 1915 Epstein showed a number of portrait busts, including those of Iris Beerbohm Tree and Lilian Shelley, at a National Portrait Society exhibition, all of which received positive reviews and sold well. He subsequently produced a notable portrait bust of Admiral Lord Fisher. During 1916, the Epsteins left Pett Level and moved to Guildford Street in the Bloomsbury area of central London.

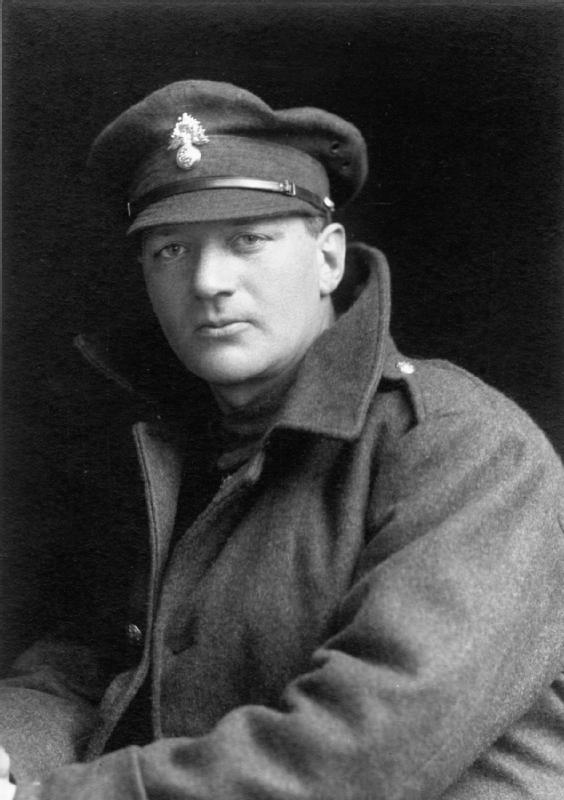
Private Jacob Epstein

As Epstein had become a naturalized British subject in December 1910 he was liable to conscription into the British armed forces. After lobbying by Margaret Epstein, John Quinn and others, a three-month exemption from conscription was granted, which allowed Epstein to prepare for a major solo exhibition at the Leicester Galleries in February and March 1917. The exhibition drew large crowds and was a critical and commercial success. A further three-month exemption from conscription was granted, but after a press campaign featuring objections from, among others, G. K. Chesterton and the sculptor Adrian Jones, plus a question in the House of Commons, the concession was withdrawn. By September 1917 Epstein was a private in the 38th Battalion of the Royal Fusiliers, known as the Jewish Legion, stationed at the Crownhill barracks, Plymouth.

Several attempts were made to have Epstein created an official war artist. His release from active service and secondment to the new Imperial War Museum was approved by Field Marshal Douglas Haig in December 1917 but promptly withdrawn after the sculptor George Frampton raised objections. The scheduled departure of his regiment to the Middle East precipitated a breakdown in Epstein. After he was found wandering on Dartmoor, and spent a period in hospital, he was discharged from the army in July 1918 without having left England. After the war ended, Muirhead Bone purchased for the Imperial War Museum three portrait busts of military subjects by Epstein including The Tin Hat and Sergeant D F Hunter, VC.

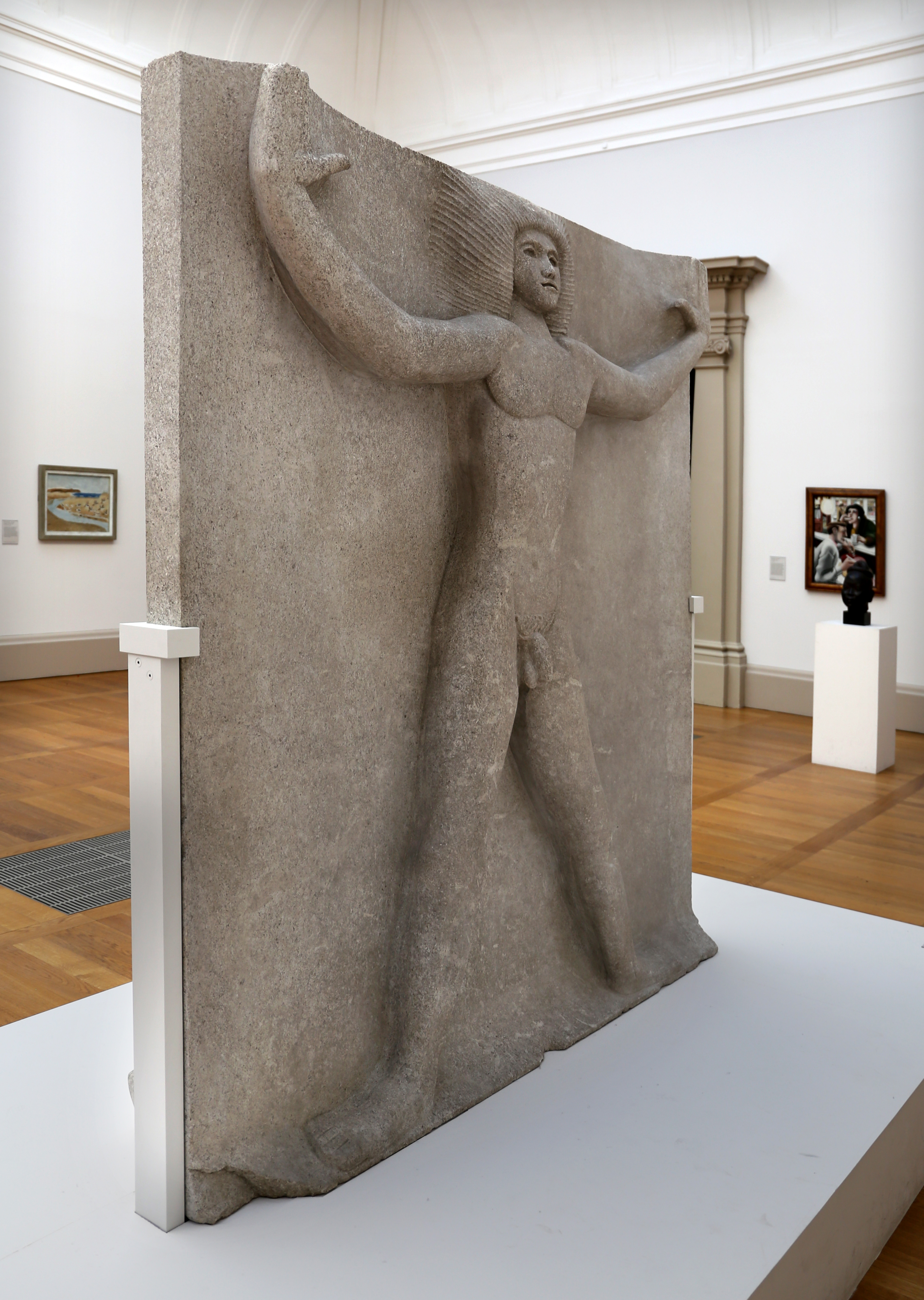
Sun God, 1910

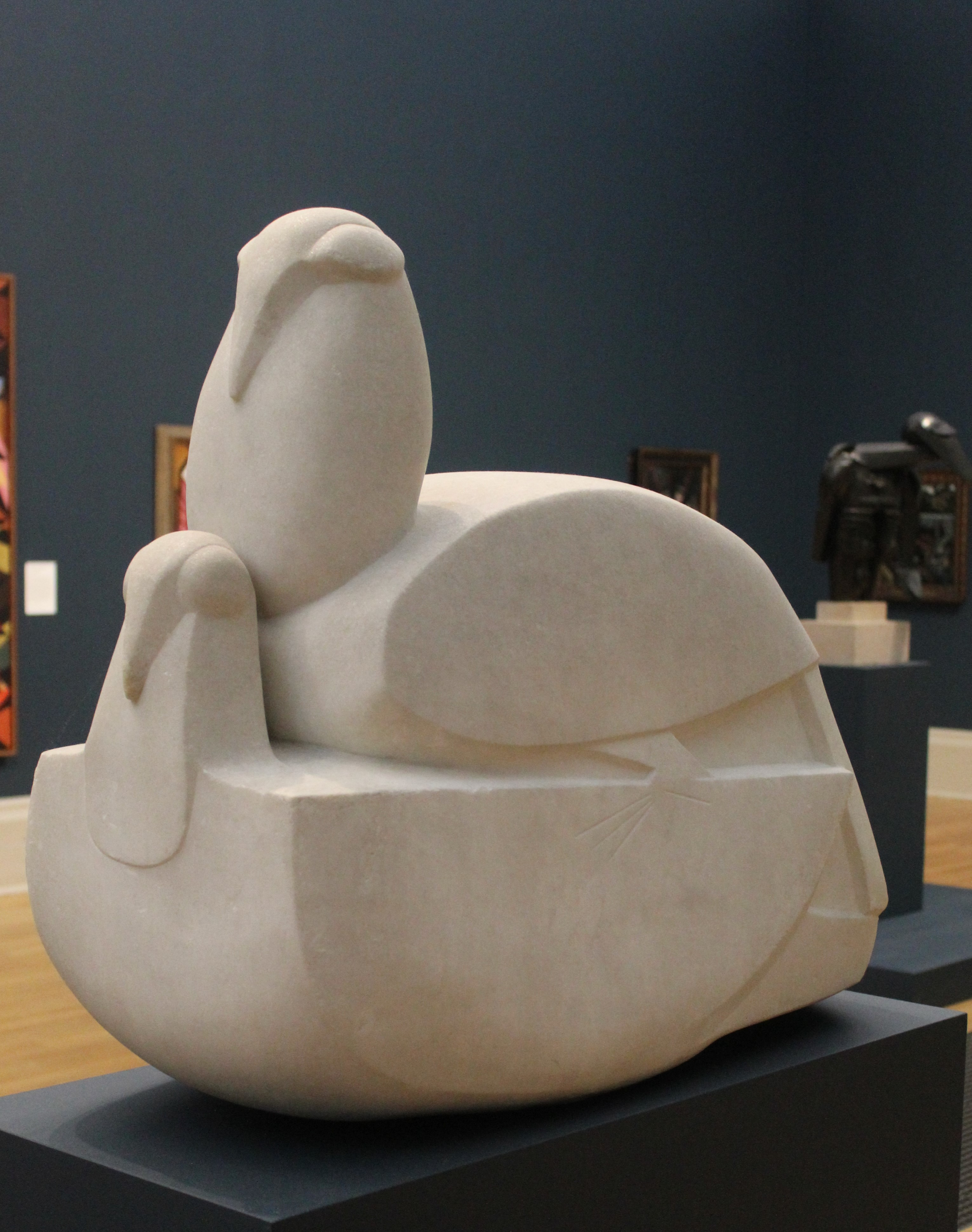
Doves Second Version, 1915

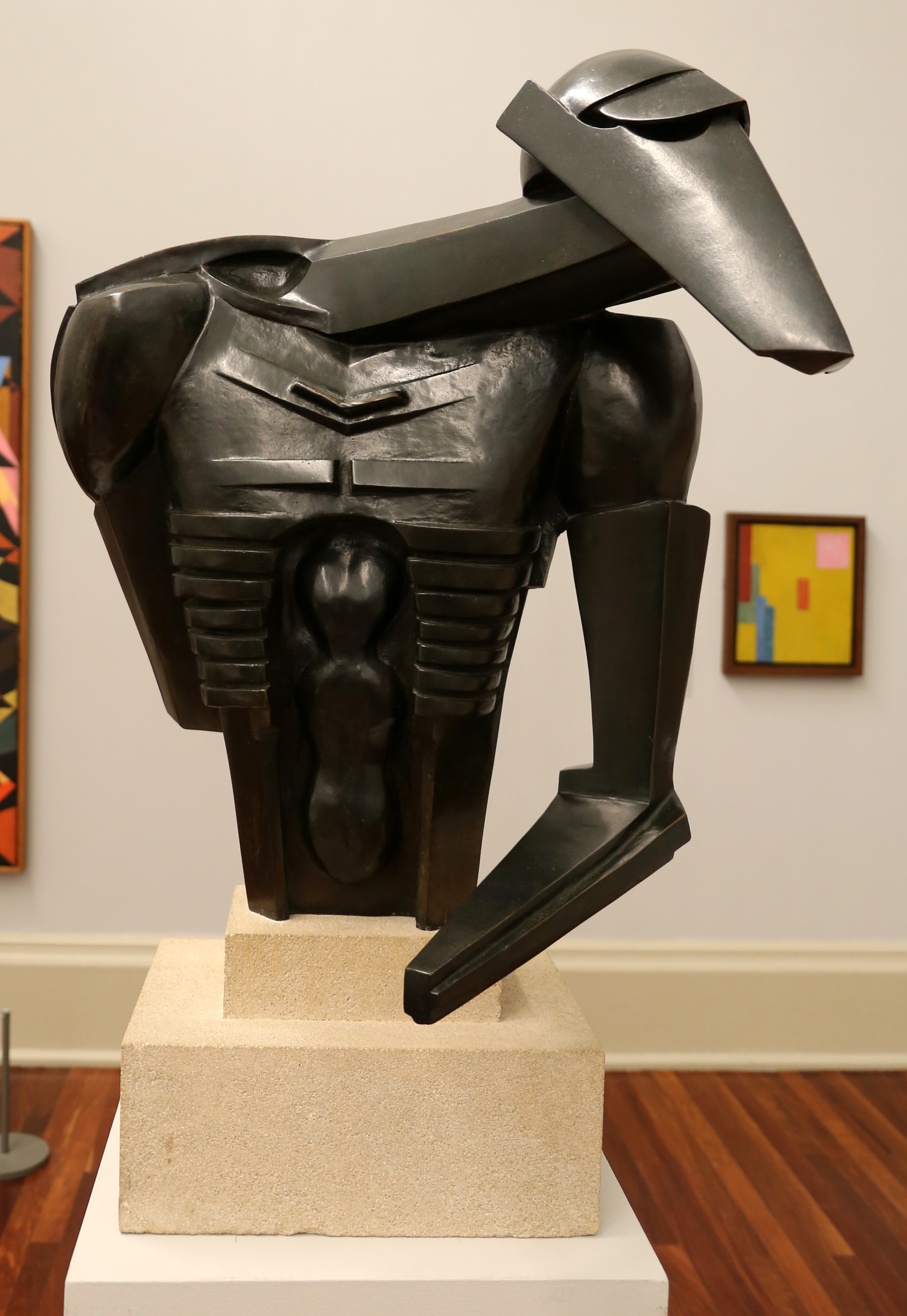
Torso in Metal, 1916

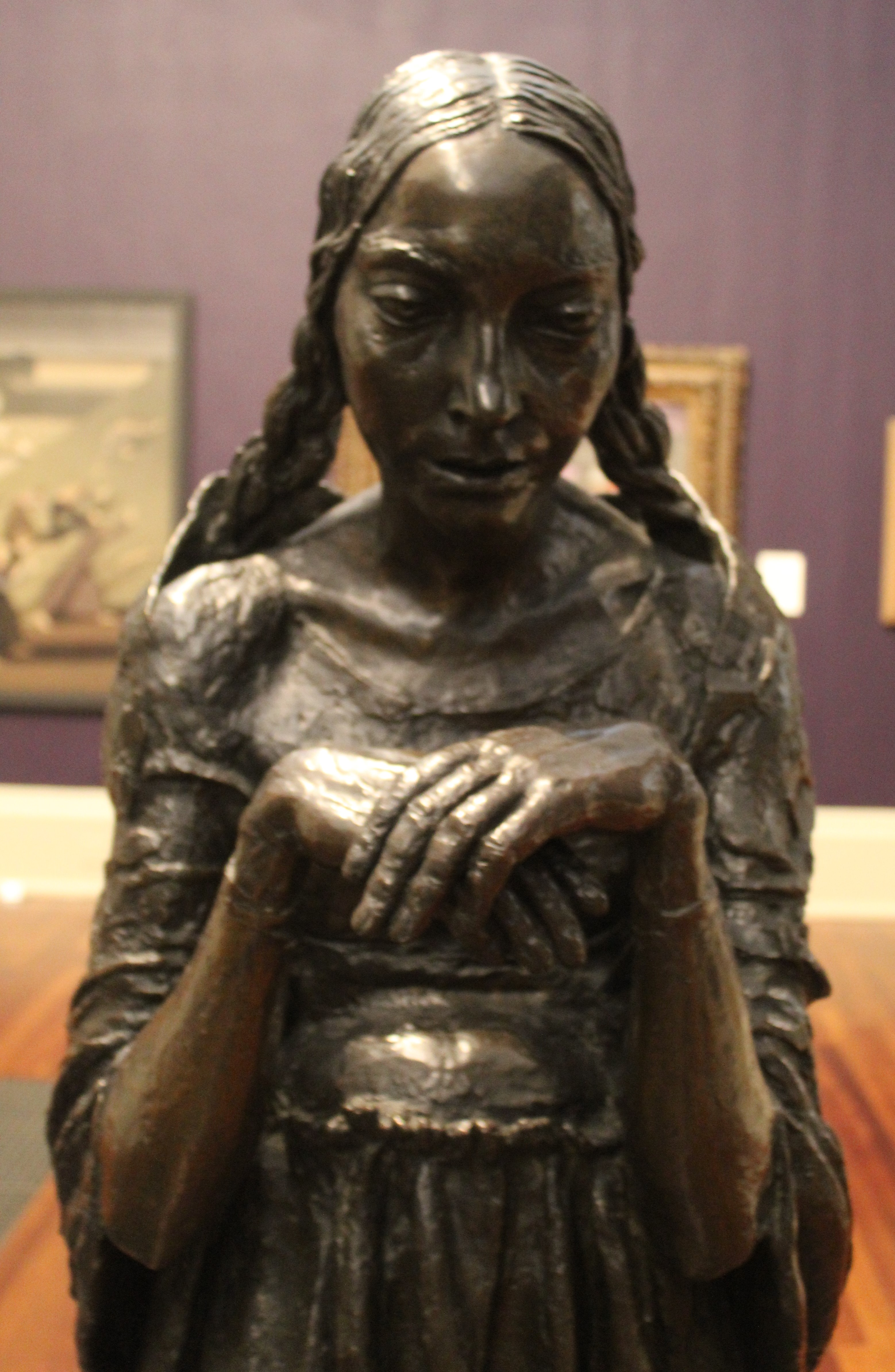
The Visitation, 1926

=== The Risen Christ ===
Epstein spent most of 1919 making portrait sculptures but also returned to work on a large bronze, The Risen Christ, which he had abandoned when called up. When exhibited at the Leicester Galleries in February 1920, the seven-foot figure of a gaunt, accusing Christ figure provoked a torrent of abuse towards Epstein, some of which was racist in nature. The controversy brought over a thousand people a day through the turnstiles of the Leicester Galleries for the exhibition. The Risen Christ was bought by the explorer Apsley Cherry-Garrard and eventually acquired by the National Galleries of Scotland.

=== The Hudson memorial ===
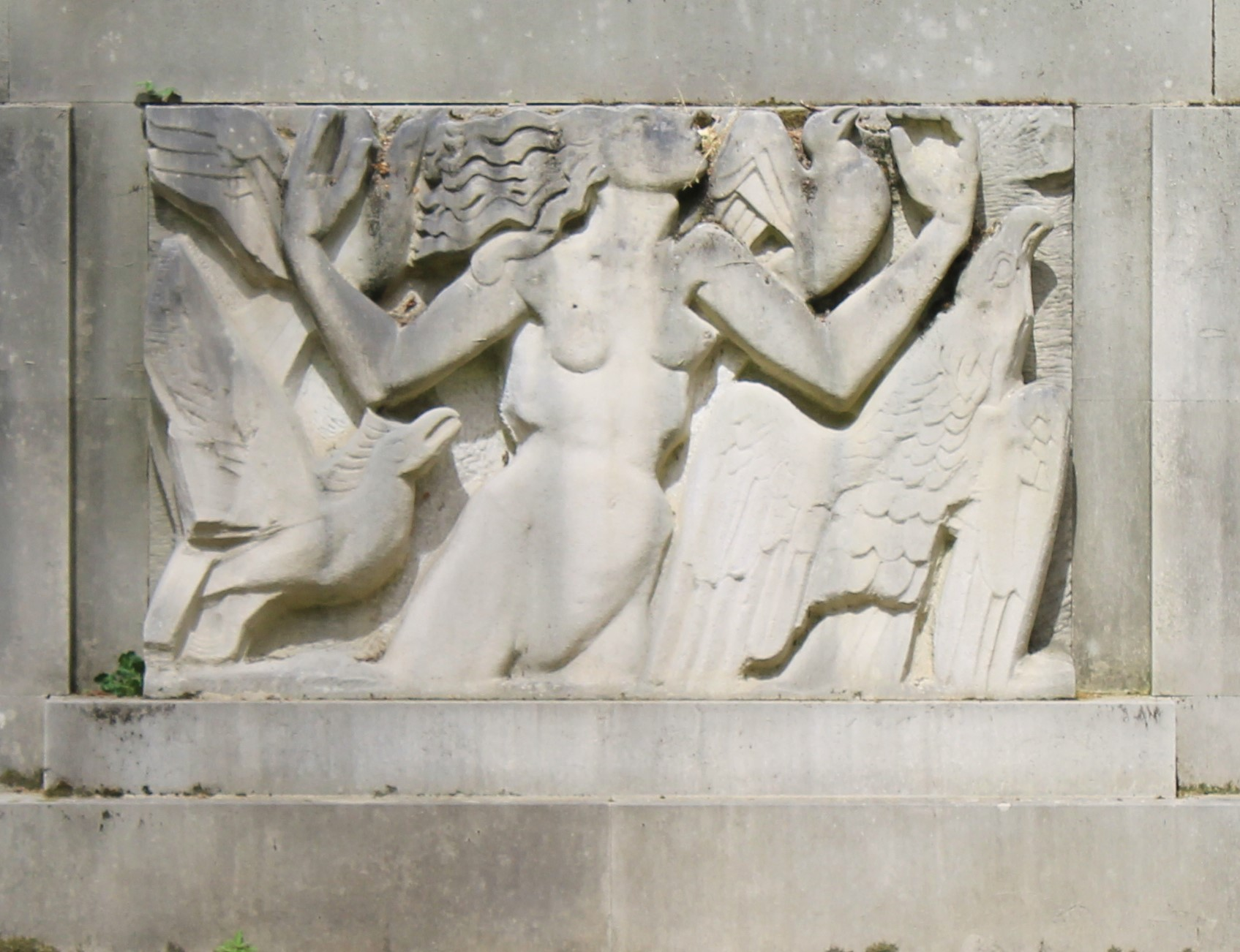
Detail of the Hudson memorial

In 1922, Epstein secured a commission from the Royal Society for the Protection of Birds, RSPB, for a memorial in Hyde Park, London to the author and naturalist W. H. Hudson. By early 1923, he had produced a model of Hudson beside a tree, looking at a bird. The RSPB approved the design but the park authorities objected and requested a new design. Epstein's new design focused on the character Rima, from Hudson's novel Green Mansions and, after submitting numerous treatments of the figure, a final design was approved in February 1924. When Prime Minister Stanley Baldwin unveiled the memorial on 19 May 1925, there were gasps of horror at the sight of the bare-breasted figure Epstein had created. Arthur Conan Doyle organised a petition to have the memorial removed. The Daily Mail ran the headline "Take this horror out of the Park" while the Morning Post described Rima as "hideous, unnatural, unEnglish" and a question was asked in the House of Commons about "this specimen of Bolshevik art". The abuse aimed at Rima and Epstein lasted for years. The memorial was vandalised with paint in November 1925 and, at different times, during the 1930s was defaced with swastikas and fascist slogans.

In January 1924 the Leicester Galleries held their third exhibition of Epstein's works. The exhibition attracted few sales but did elicit a critical and damaging review in the New Statesman by Roger Fry and an unsigned and overtly racist article in The New Age. Through Muirhead Bone, Epstein was commissioned by the government of Poland to create a portrait bust of Joseph Conrad. Epstein, wrote Conrad, "has produced a wonderful piece of work of a somewhat monumental dignity, and yet—everybody agrees—the likeness is striking." The Polish government refused to accept the work, completed a few months before Conrad died, and it was eventually, in 1960, acquired by the National Portrait Gallery in London.

=== America 1927 ===
In 1927 Epstein agreed to hold an exhibition in New York at the Ferargil Gallery on West 47th Street and spent most of that year preparing fifty works for the show. The exhibition was a success, with several pieces selling including two bought by public collections. During his four months in America, Epstein made three portrait busts, most notably one of the singer Paul Robeson.

In early 1928 the Epstein family moved to 18 Hyde Park Gate, a five-storey house with a ballroom that became Epstein's studio and allowed him to start gathering together his unsold and unfinished works from various sheds and garages around London. He also retained Deerhurst, a cottage and studio at Loughton in Epping Forest.

=== Night and Day ===
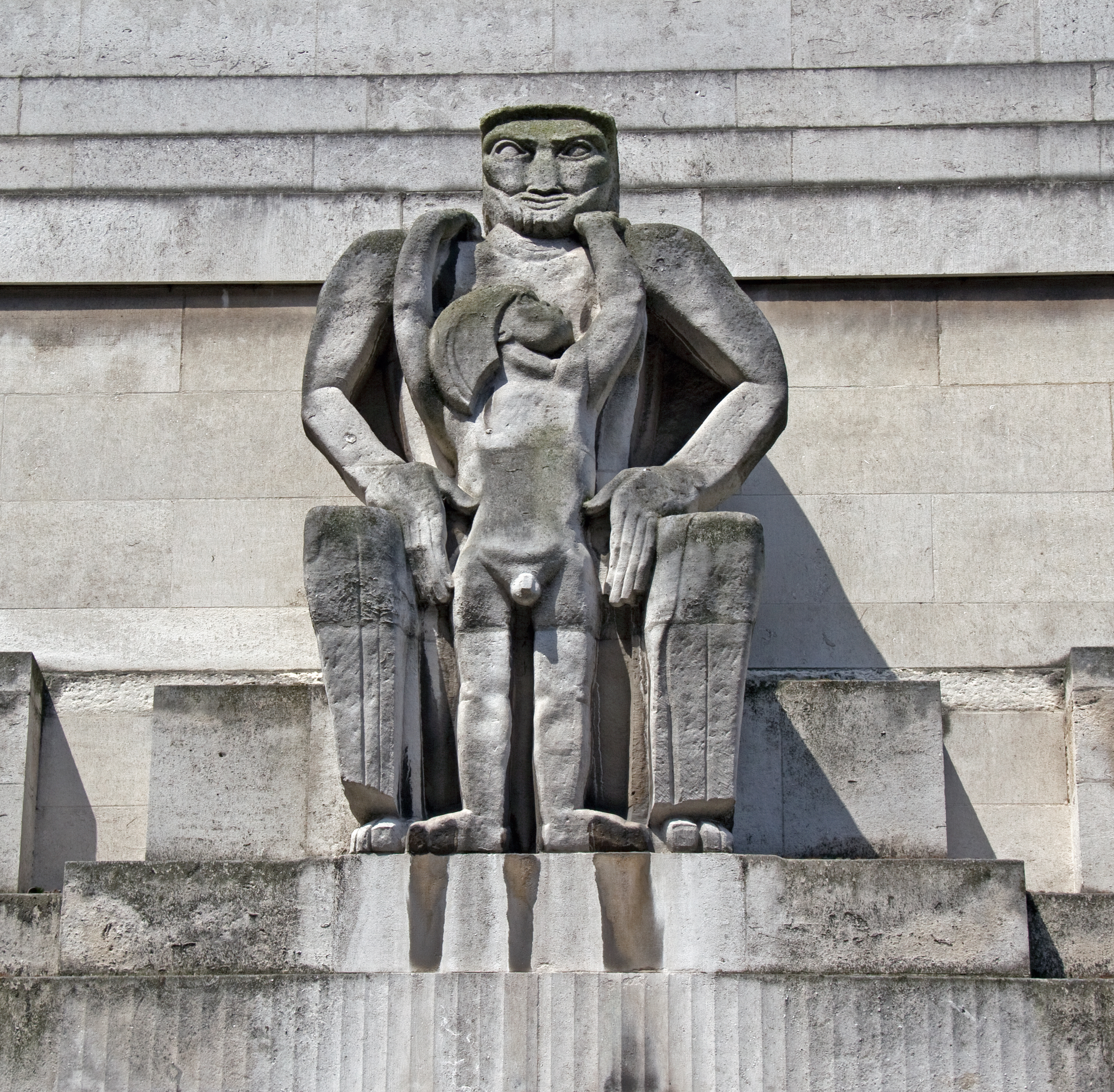
Day, 1929

A commission from Charles Holden for two sculptures for the new headquarters building of the London Electric Railway generated further controversy in 1929. Epstein's sculptures Day and Night above the entrances of 55 Broadway were criticised as indecent, ugly and primitive although some critics, notably R. H. Wilenski, regarded them as a major achievement. Starting in October 1928 Epstein carved the two figures in-situ as the upper floors of the building were being built above him. Aware of the potential for controversy, he was not identified, in public at least, as the sculptor until May 1929 when Night was completed to a storm of criticism. A debate raged for some time over demands to remove the statues. To placate the railway board, Holden persuaded Epstein to modify the penis of the smaller of the two figures represented on Day. An attempt to vandalise Night was made in October 1929, a few days before the Hudson memorial was defaced. The controversy affected Epstein's ability to gain commissions for large public works, which largely dried up for twenty years.

=== Early 1930s ===
Without any commissions for large public monuments throughout the 1930s, Epstein worked on a number of large sculptures on religious subjects of personal significance to himself, while supporting his family with commissions for portrait busts and by selling paintings of flowers and landscapes.

In 1929, Epstein carved Genesis, a massive, marble, three-ton figure of a pregnant woman with a swollen belly and a face based on an African mask. When shown as part of Epstein's February 1930 exhibition at the Leicester Galleries, the response to Genesis was vicious, not just from the popular press but from more serious journals. Epstein took particular exception to an insulting review by the artist Paul Nash. After a break of almost twenty years, Epstein returned to the sculpture Sun God and began, in 1932, to carve a new relief on the rear side of the block, a hunched male figure with two infant forms across his body, titled Primeval Gods.

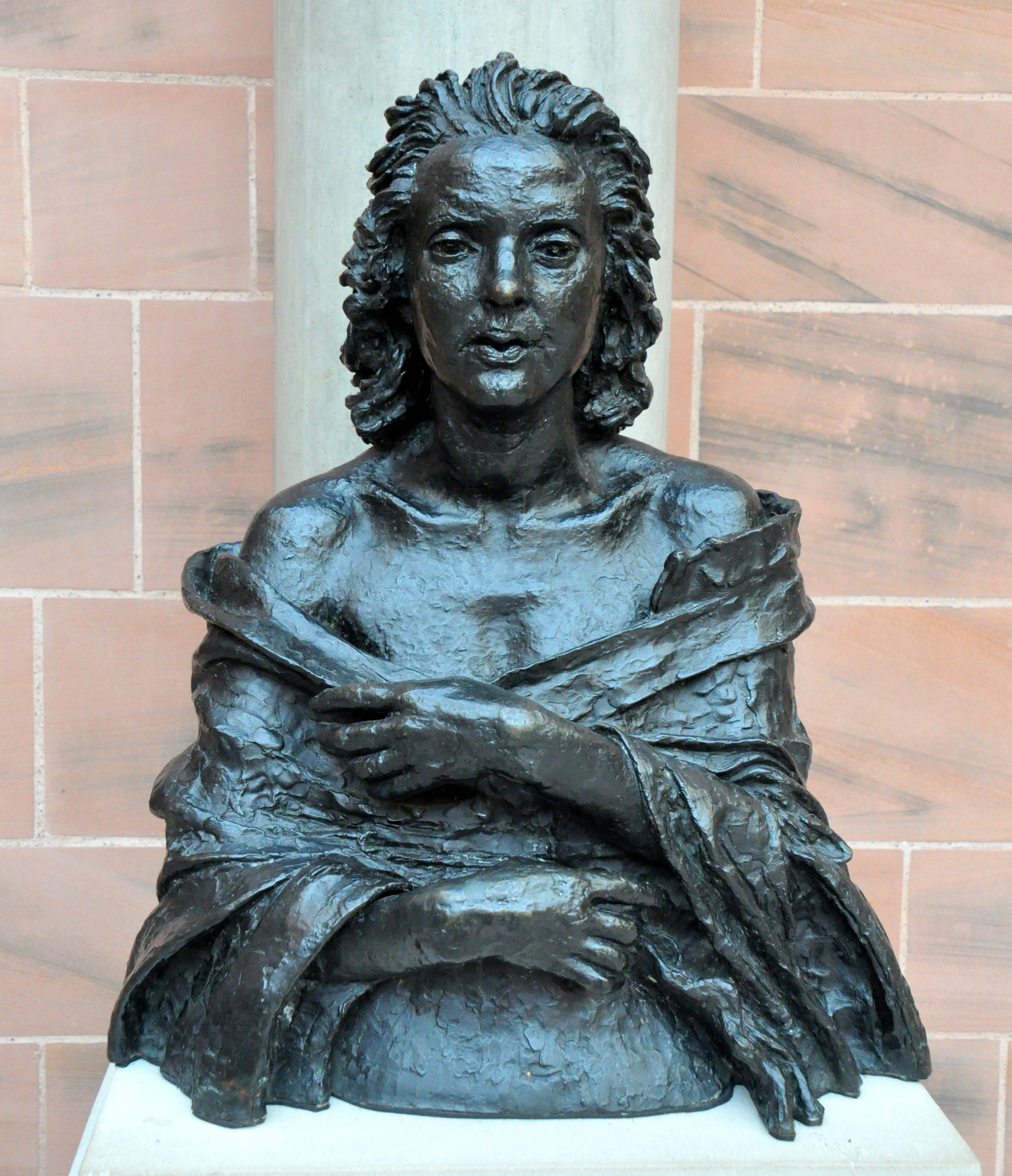
Lilian Shelly, 1920

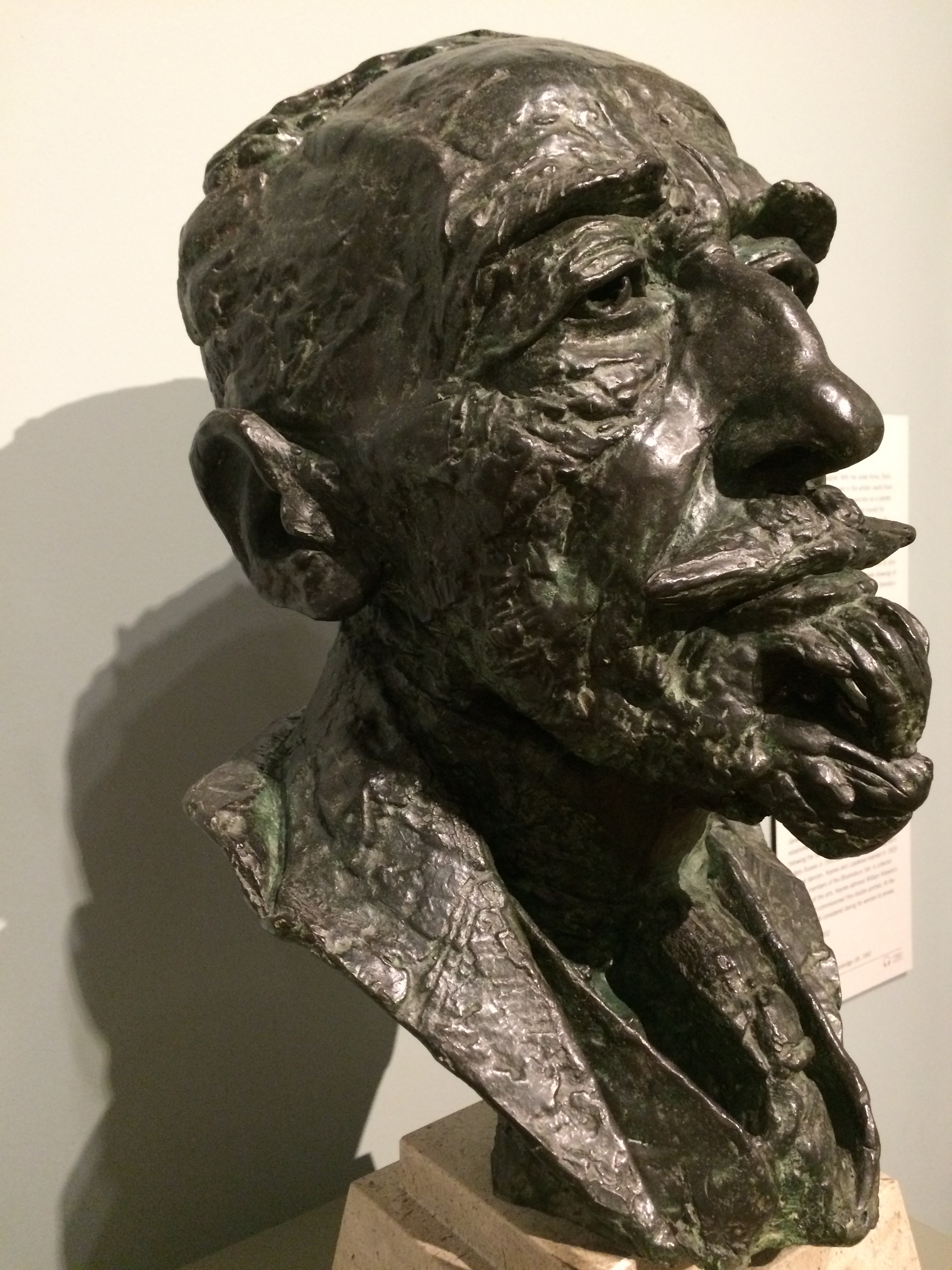
Joseph Conrad, 1924

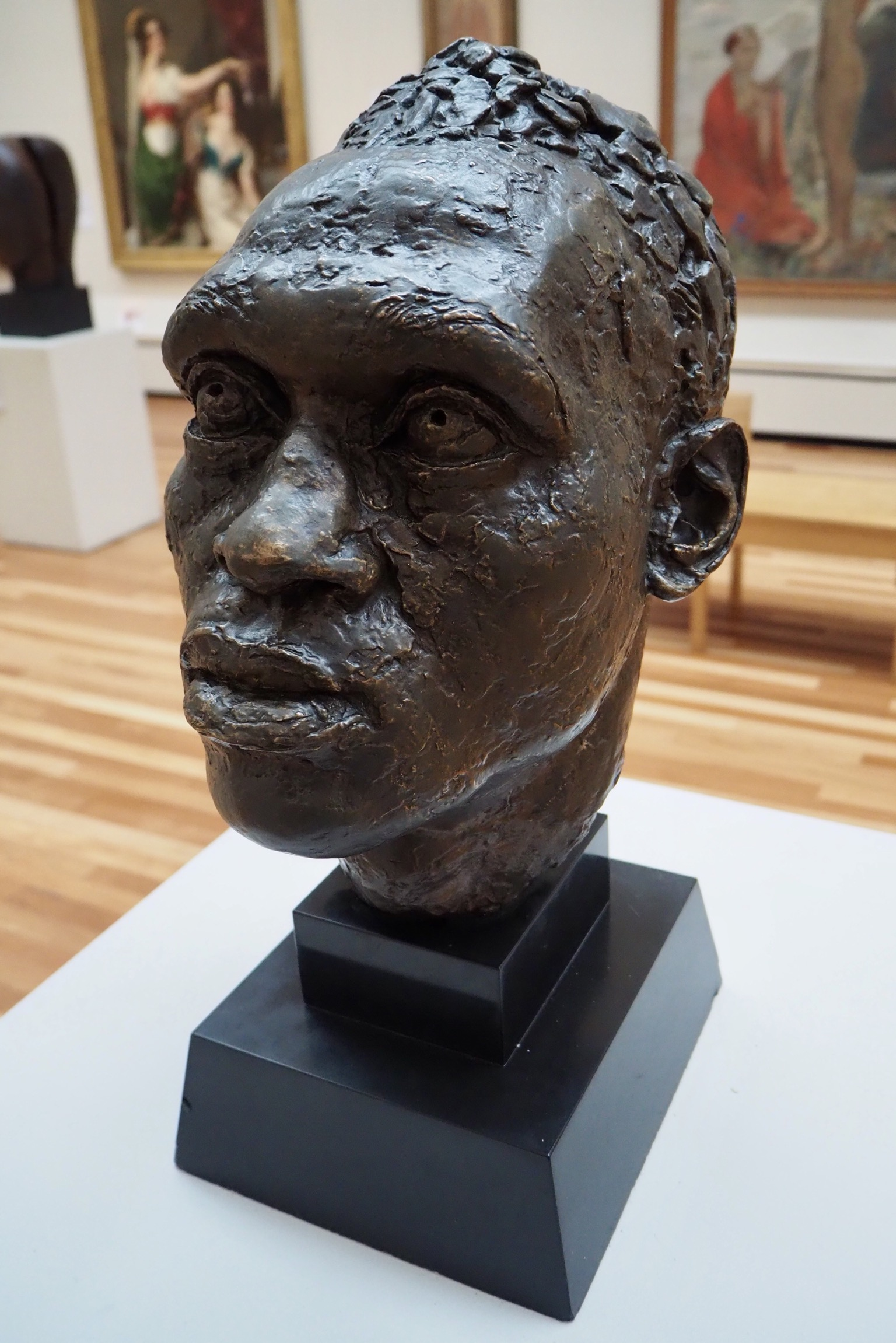
Paul Robeson, 1927

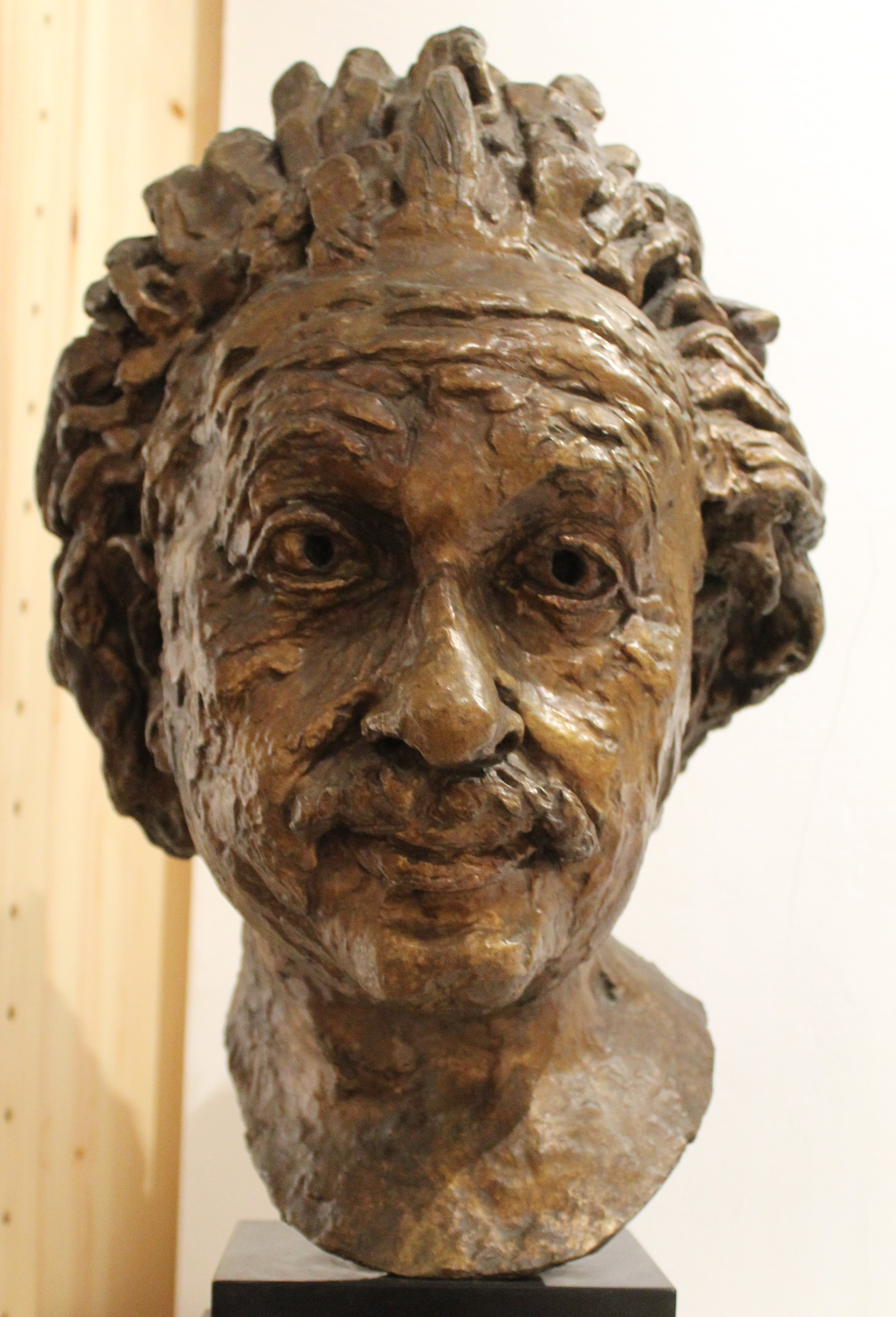
Albert Einstein, 1933

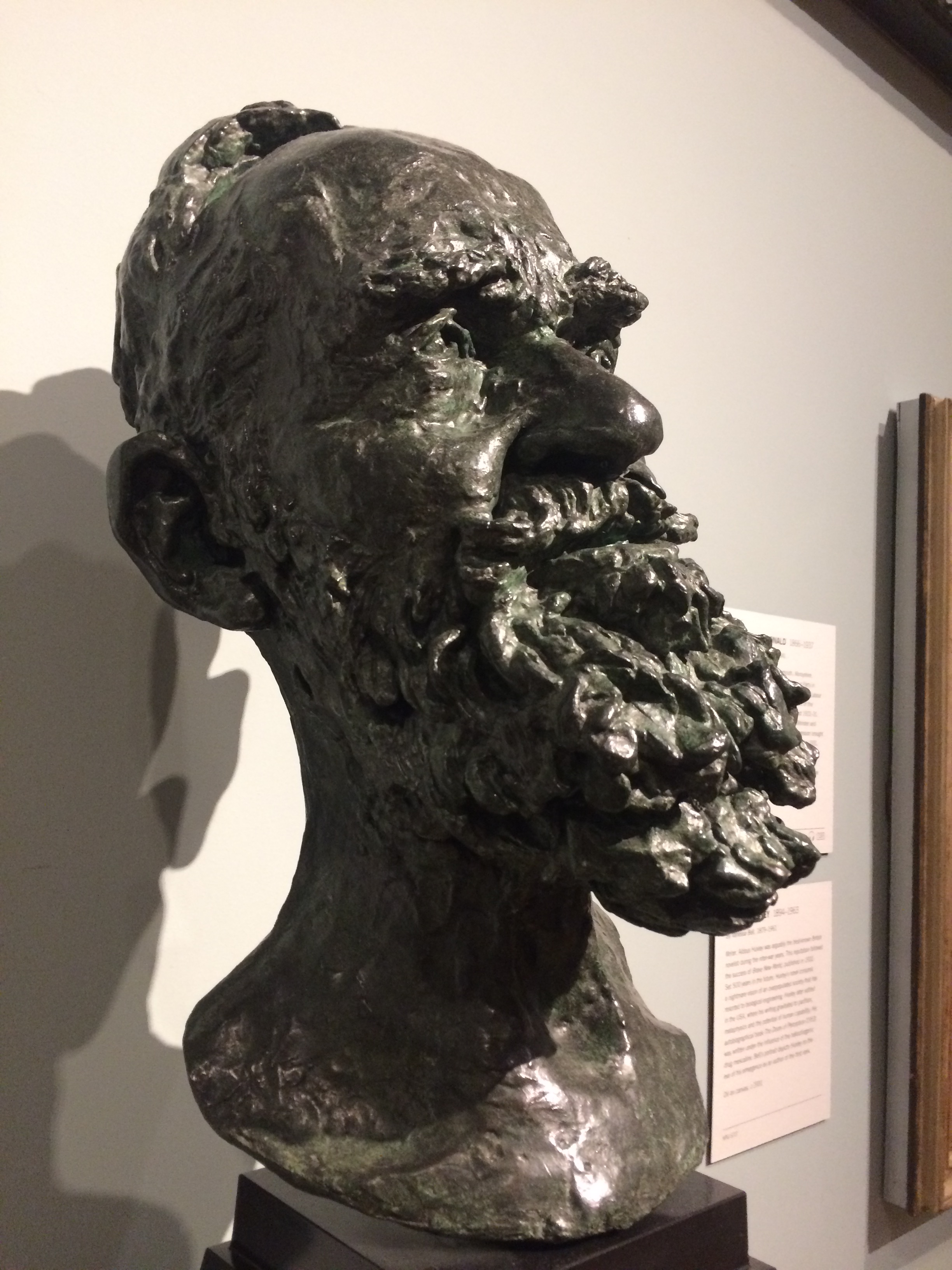
George Bernard Shaw, 1934

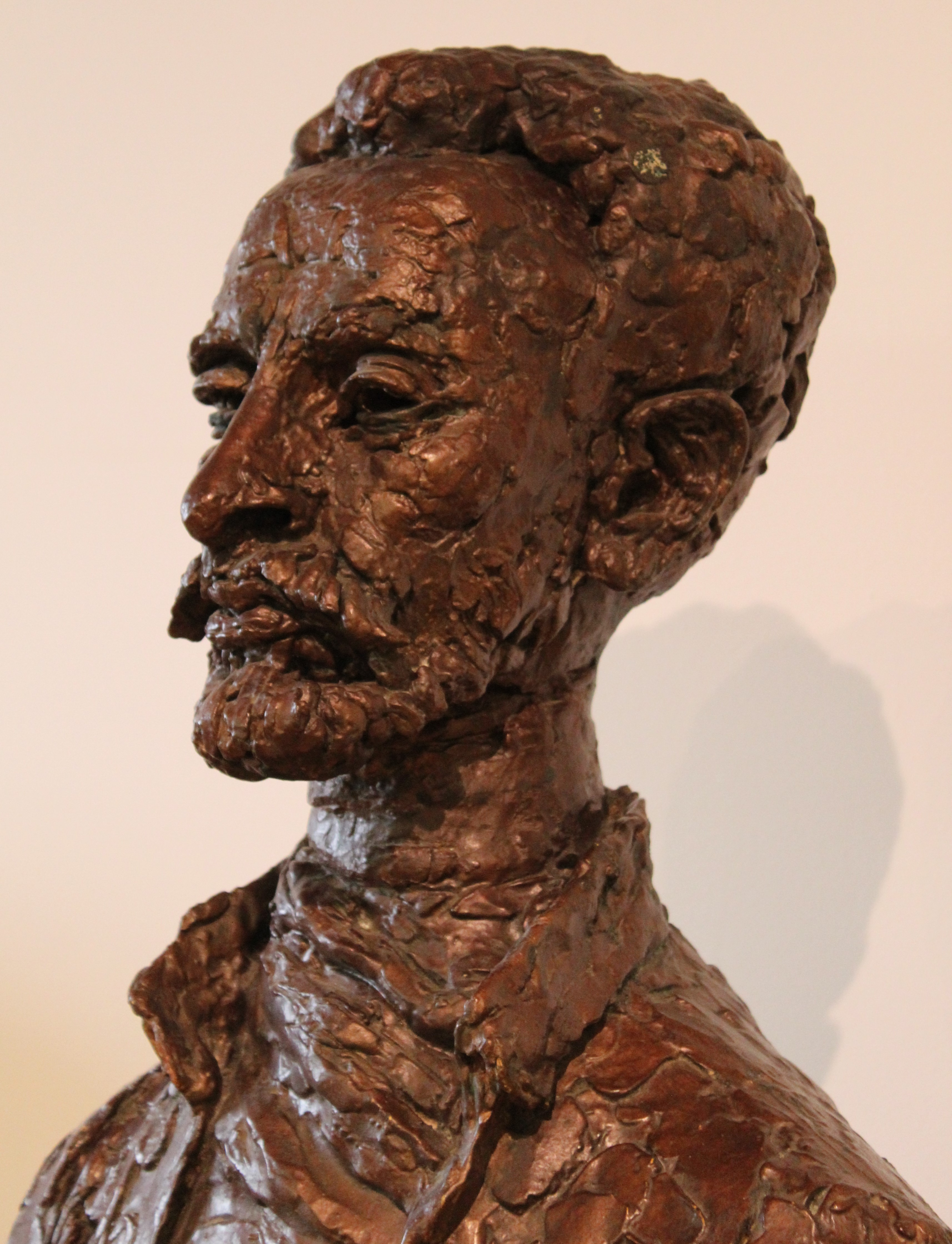
Emperor Haile Selassie I, 1936

In 1932, Epstein opened an exhibition of watercolours at The Redfern Gallery. The exhibition was based on Old Testament characters and scenes.

Epstein spent the summer of 1933 at his cottage in Epping Forest and, in the space of two months, painted over a hundred landscapes and flower compositions. These were shown at Tooth's Gallery that Christmas and these Christmas exhibitions of his paintings became a popular annual event. During September 1933, on his way to America, Albert Einstein spent some weeks at Roughton Heath, Norfolk, and agreed to sit for Epstein over seven days. Of his meeting with Einstein, Epstein wrote, "His glance contained a mixture of the humane, the humorous and the profound. This was a combination which delighted me. He resembled the ageing Rembrandt."

=== Ecce Homo, 1934 ===
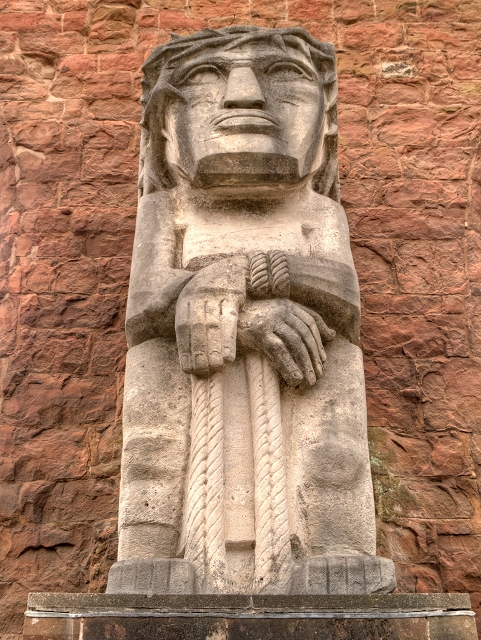
Ecce Homo

Throughout 1934 Epstein struggled with carving a huge block of marble that proved so tough it regularly broke his tools until he had a new set of instruments made for the work. Behold the Man (Ecce Homo) depicted a squat Christ with a huge head that, in Epstein's words, was 'a symbol of man, bound, crowned with thorns and facing with a relentless and over-mastering gaze of pity and prescience our unhappy world'. First shown, unfinished, at the Leicester Galleries in March 1935, Ecce Homo led to a storm of criticism including accusations of blasphemy. Some newspapers considered the work so grotesque they refused to publish photographs of it. Anthony Blunt wrote a positive review for The Spectator, stating that the scale of the work was more suitable for a large church rather than an art gallery. Epstein never sold the work and it remained in his studio throughout his life. In 1958 he was approached by the rector of Selby Abbey in Yorkshire, who asked if Epstein would leave Ecce Homo to the abbey in his will. He agreed but local church members raised a petition that persuaded the church authorities to overrule the rector and refuse the gift. It was not until 1969 that Ecce Homo, donated by Epstein's widow Kathleen Garman, was finally installed in the ruins of Coventry Cathedral.

=== The Strand sculptures, 1935–1937 ===
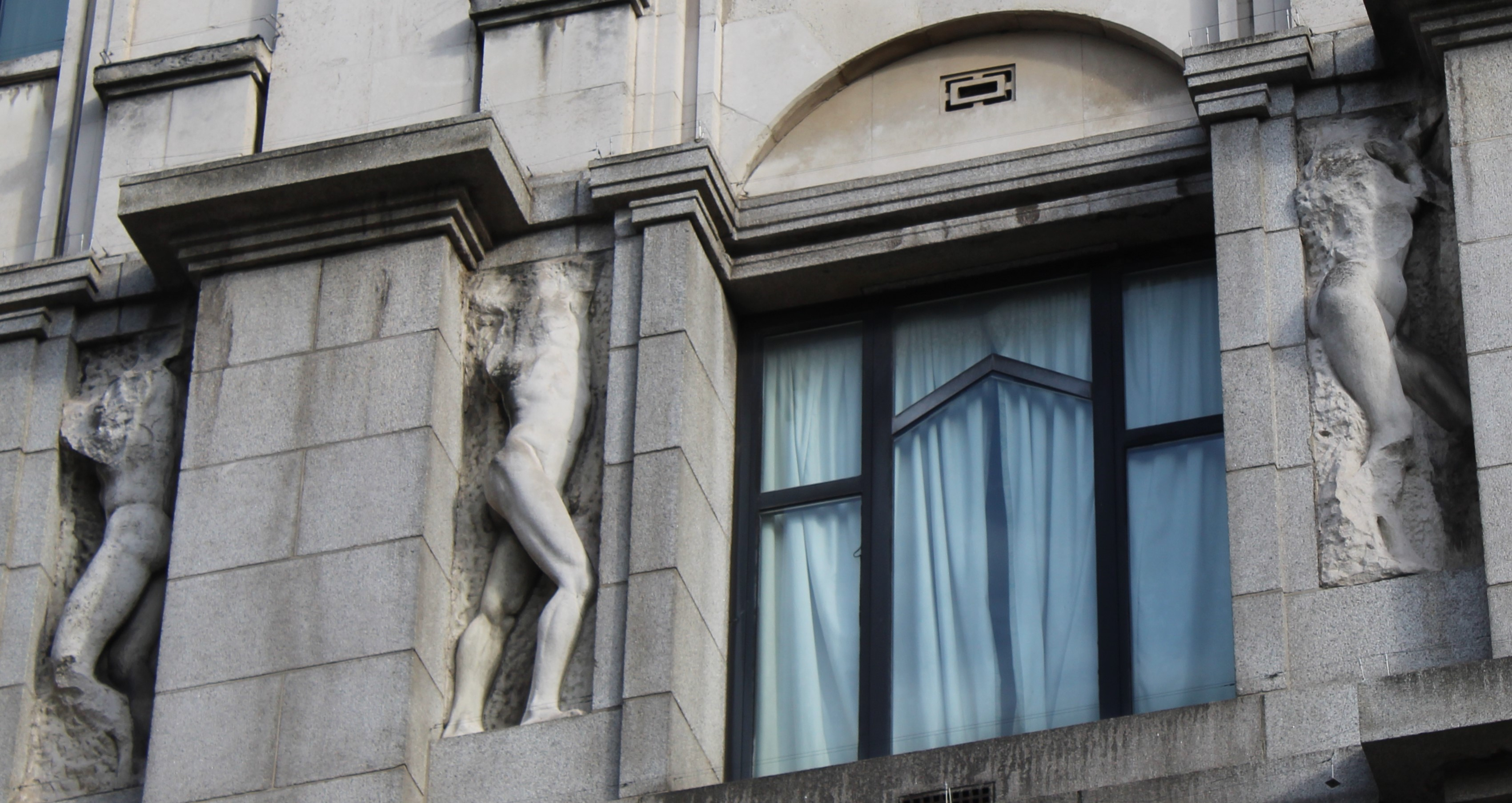
Remains of three of the Strand sculptures in 2023

By 1926, the British Medical Association had vacated their Strand headquarters and the building was sold to the government of New Zealand which, in 1928, commissioned a structural survey of Epstein's 1908 statues. This survey found extensive signs of erosion, weathering and other damage among them. No further action was taken at that time but in 1935 the building was sold to the government of Southern Rhodesia and the new owners soon announced their intention to remove Epstein's statues from the building. A vigorous campaign was again launched to preserve the figures. The leaders of nine of Britain's leading art organisations, but notably not the Royal Academy, signed a letter supporting the preservation of the statues. That campaign was a success until 1937 when, as some bunting, erected for the coronation of George VI, was being removed from the building, a piece of one figure was knocked off and fell to the pavement below. The London County Council instructed the owners to make the building safe. The owners declared all the projecting features of the statues to be unsafe and were to be removed. Attempts to find an alternative solution, such as removing and re-carving elements of the statues, were hindered when Epstein insulted the Southern Rhodesian High Commissioner in a press interview. The parts hacked off included the heads and hands of all eighteen figures, the feet of most of them and other key defining elements, such as the foetus from the Matter statue and the figure of a new-born baby from Infancy. Several of these pieces were eventually acquired by the National Gallery of Canada and one of the heads was later found at a school in Bulawayo.

=== Late 1930s ===
In the second half of the 1930s alongside his sculpture work, Epstein took on other projects in different media. With the artist Bernard Meninsky, he designed and painted the stage curtain for the ballet David at the Duke of York's Theatre in central London. The curtain, now lost, was considered a great success. Considerably less appreciated was Epstein's illustrations for an edition of Les Fleurs du mal by Baudelaire. Commissioned to produce twenty drawings, Epstein created sixty illustrations that he considered among his best work in any medium, but when shown at Tooth's Gallery in December 1936, met with near universal disapproval.

During 1936, Epstein started carving a large block of alabaster in his Hyde Park Gate studio. Inspired by Bach's Mass in B minor, he carved Consummatum Est, a horizontal figure of the crucified Christ with the stigmata wounds on his hands and feet visible. Epstein began, in 1938, to sculpt Adam, a seven foot high figure carved from a three-ton block of alabaster. The directors of the Leicester Galleries were reluctant to include the naked giant figure with his oversized genitals and muscles in Epstein's June 1939 exhibition but feared he would withdraw all his work from the gallery if they didn't accept it. Adam was of great personal significance to Epstein who had, throughout the first half of 1939, worked day and night on the figure. Alongside the usual outrage that greeted much of Epstein's work, Oswald Mosley's fascist group threatened to attack it.

A photograph of the unfinished Adam formed the frontispiece of the first edition of Epstein's autobiography Let There Be Sculpture which was published in 1940. Forty pages, a fifth of the book, was devoted to Epstein's account of the Strand sculptures controversy.

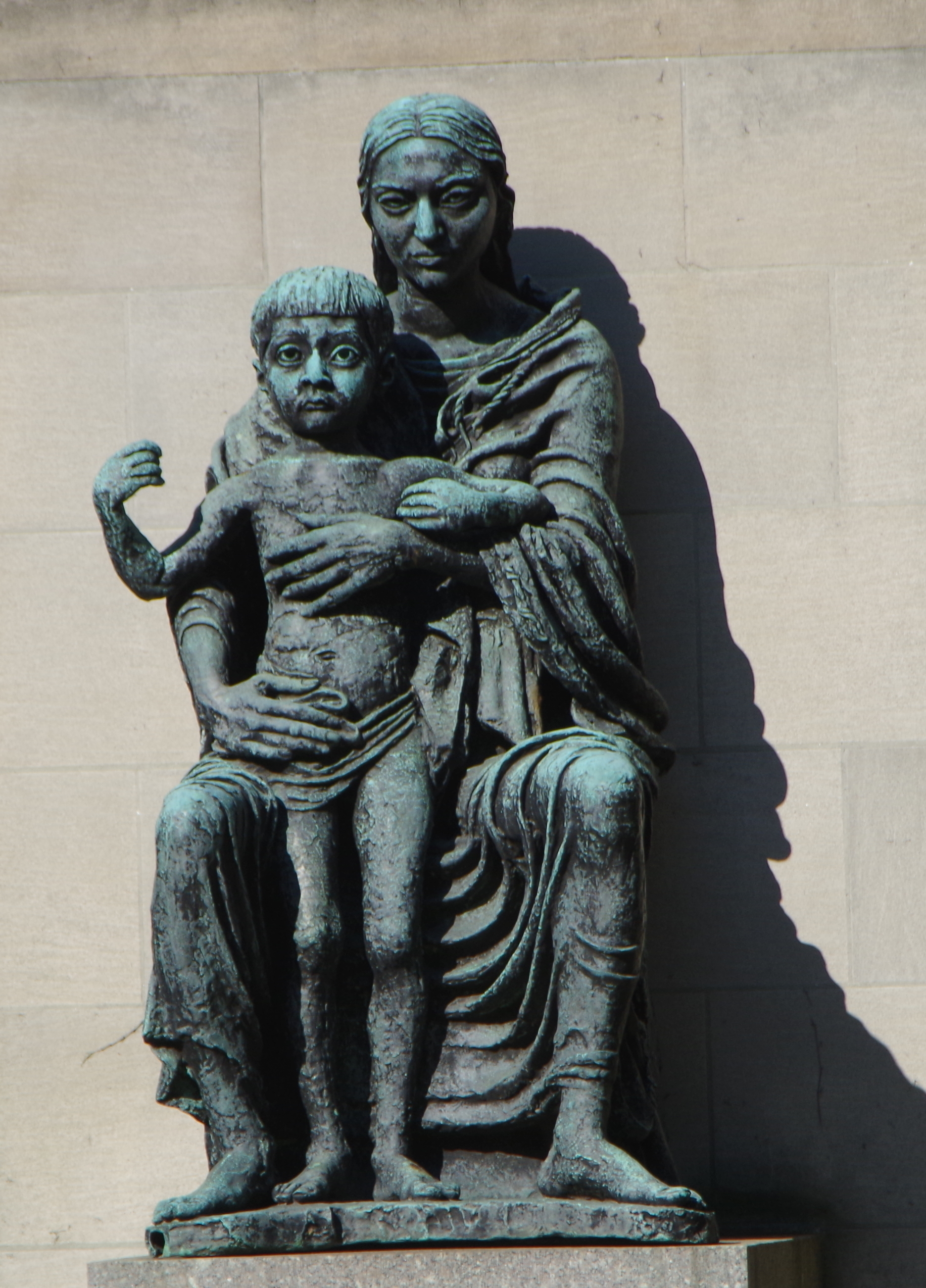
Madonna and Child, 1927

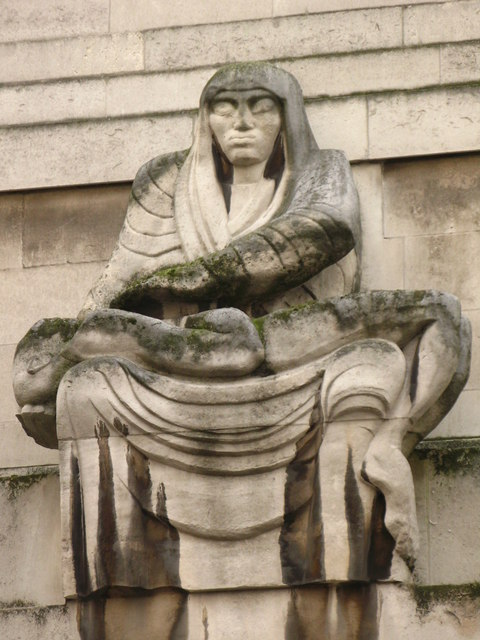
Night, 1929

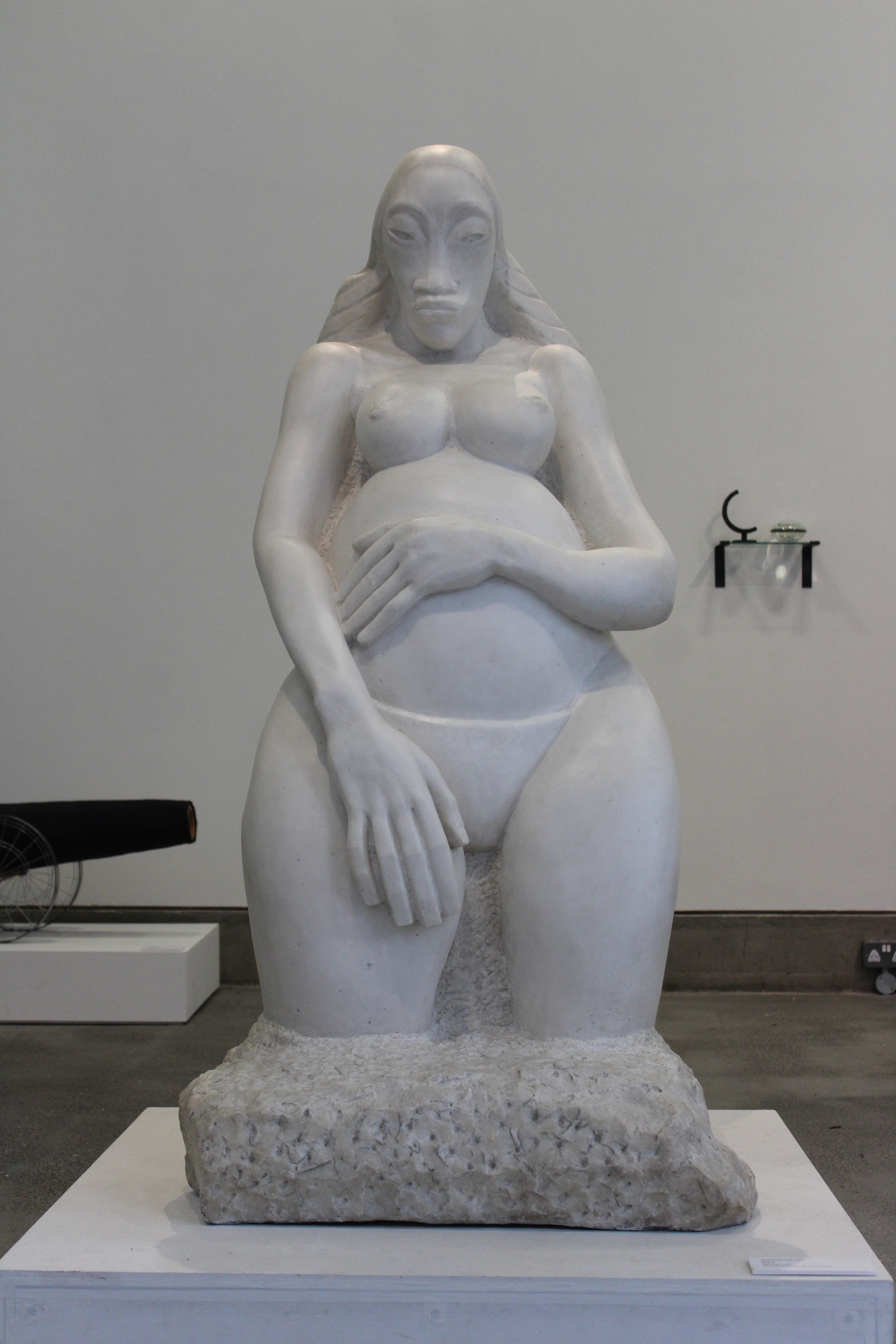
Genesis, 1930

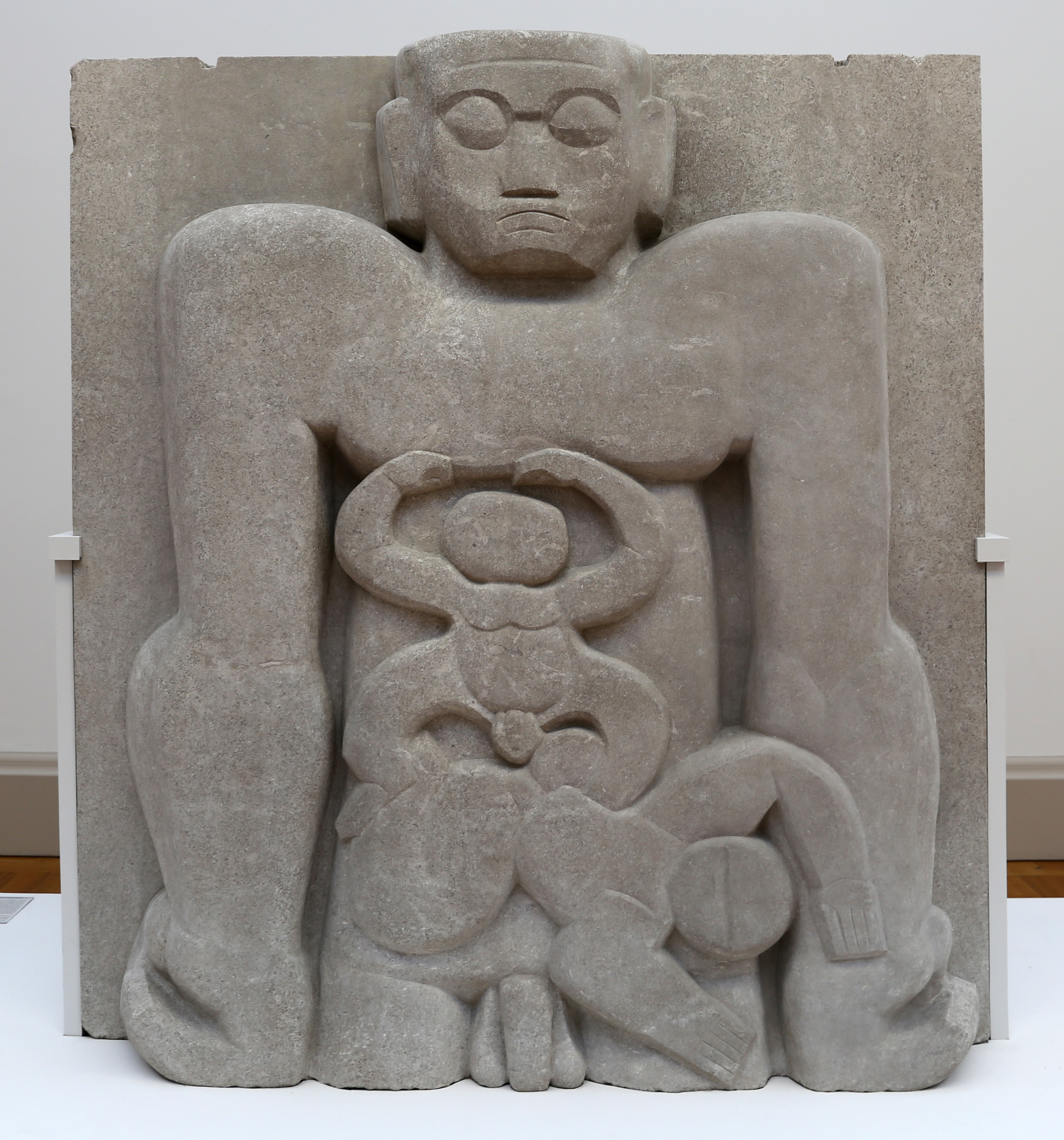
Primeval Gods, 1932

=== World War II ===
During the Second World War, Epstein was asked to undertake six commissions for the War Artists' Advisory Committee. After completing bronze busts of Admiral of the Fleet Sir Andrew Cunningham, General Sir Alan Cunningham, Air Marshal Sir Charles Portal and Ernest Bevin, Epstein accepted a commission to create busts of John Anderson and Winston Churchill. He completed the bust of Winston Churchill in early 1947. By then, Churchill was living in Hyde Park Gate across the road from Epstein and the two became friendly. Epstein had numerous casts of the Churchill bust made and it was among his most popular works.

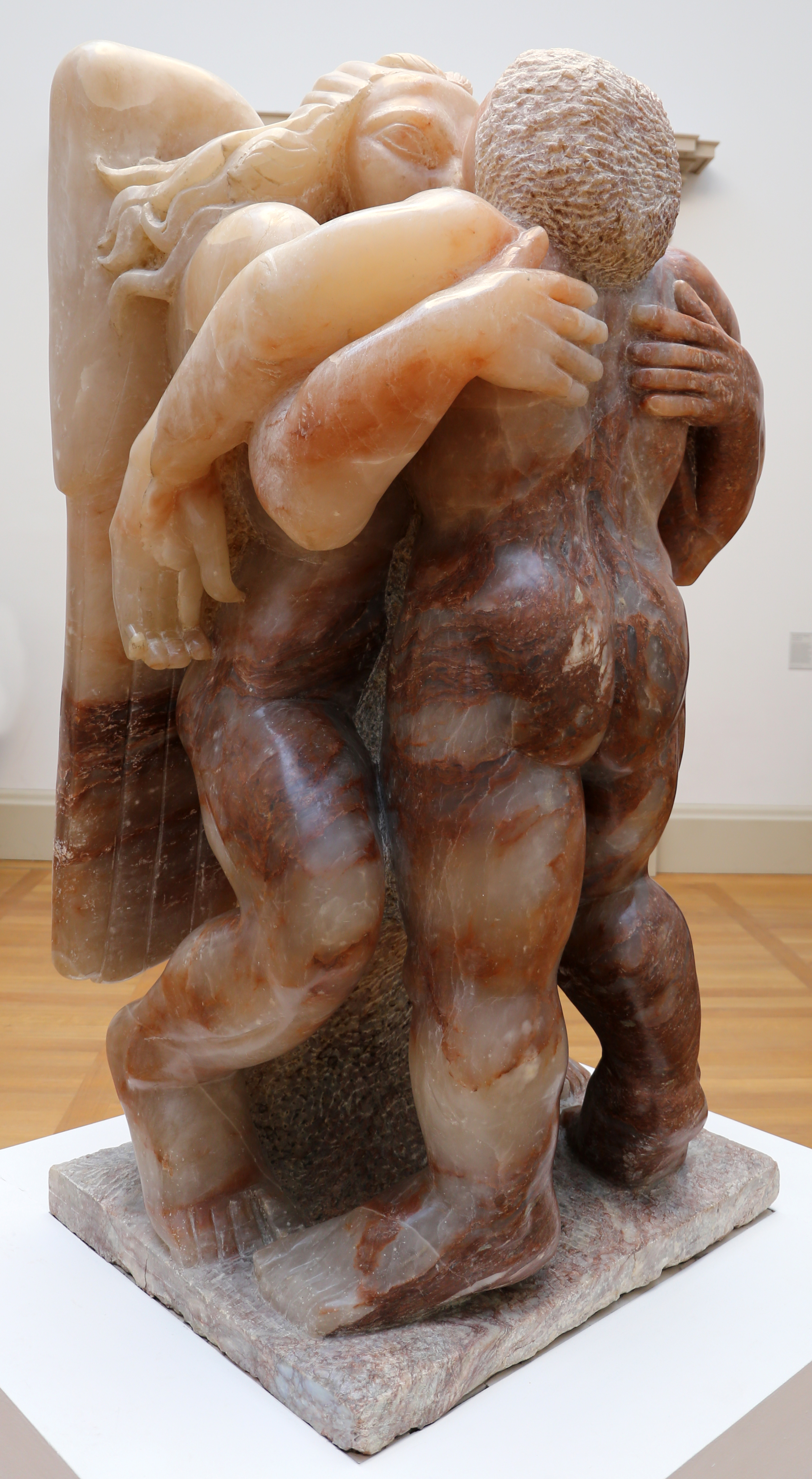
Jacob and the Angel, 1942

Throughout the war, Epstein continued to paint flowers and woodland scenes of Epping Forest and hold commercially successful Christmas exhibitions of those works. He also worked on two large private projects, Jacob and the Angel and Lucifer. First exhibited in February 1942, Jacob and the Angel, based on a Bible story, depicts two figures, one winged, locked in an embrace carved from a four-ton block of alabaster, streaked with veins of pink and brown.

Epstein imagined the fallen angel Lucifer as a tall, winged, androgynous figure with male genitals and a female face, that of the Kashmiri model Sunita Devi, all cast in a golden patinated bronze. The front of the Leicester Galleries had to be removed to get the statue inside for its first public showing in October 1945. Despite positive reviews, Lucifer remained unsold until 1946 when A. W. Lawrence, the brother of T. E. Lawrence, and the Seven Pillars of Wisdom Trust purchased it with the intention of donating it to the Fitzwilliam Museum in Cambridge. The Fitzwilliam refused the donation as did both the Victoria and Albert Museum and the Tate but several other museums did show interest and Epstein was pleased when the statue entered the collection of the Birmingham Museum and Art Gallery, where it remains.

Jacob and the Angel was bought by a businessman, Charles Stafford, who already owned Epstein's Adam, which he had been exhibiting in local fairs and fetes for its shock value. In Blackpool, he installed Jacob and the Angel in an old song booth on the promenade behind an 'Adults Only' sign. Eventually Stafford sold Jacob and the Angel and Adam, plus Consummatum Est which he also owned, to Louis Tussaud. Tussaud returned the works to Blackpool where, along with Genesis, they were exhibited in the anatomical curiosities section of his waxworks. The works were displayed alongside dancing marionettes, diseased body parts and conjoined twin babies in jars. Placing his work within the context of freakish curiosity was a constant source of anguish to Epstein.

=== 1950s ===
After the Second World War there was a notable change in attitudes to Epstein and, nearing seventy, he was about to enjoy a sustained period of recognition and one of the busiest periods of his artistic life. Early in 1950, he received his first commission in twenty years for a public monument, the statue Youth Advancing, for the 1951 Festival of Britain. Epstein's 1947 carving of Lazarus was bought by New College, Oxford and installed in the chapel there in January 1952.

In 1947, the architect Louis Osman was employed by the nuns of the Convent of the Holy Child to rebuild their bomb-damaged buildings on Cavendish Square in central London. Osman's design featured a bridge that linked two parts of the complex and would support a large sculpture. The nuns were keen to have a sculpture of the Madonna and Child and planned to employ a Catholic sculptor for the work. Osman was determined to have a work by Epstein and, without consulting the nuns, had him produce a maquette. When the convent rejected Epstein's design on cost grounds, he and Osman, with help from Kenneth Clark and the Arts Council, agreed to cover the cost themselves. The convent agreed to Epstein's design provided he would listen to any suggestions they made. After Epstein accepted their concerns about the face of the Madonna and changed the head from one based on Kathleen Garman to one modelled on her friend Marcella Bazrtti, the convent began working hard to raise funds for the sculpture to be cast in lead. Unveiled on 14 May 1953 by Rab Butler, the Chancellor of the Exchequer, the Cavendish Square Madonna and Child met with near universal praise.

While working on Madonna and Child during 1951 and 1952, Epstein undertook other major projects. In August 1951 he travelled to the United States to view the site in Fairmount Park, Philadelphia where the Philadelphia Museum of Art had commissioned him to create a large sculpture group, Social Consciousness; he was one of 250 sculptors who exhibited in the 3rd Sculpture International held there in the summer of 1949. In London, the Tate hosted a large retrospective exhibition of his work in September 1952 with fifty-nine sculptures and twenty drawings.

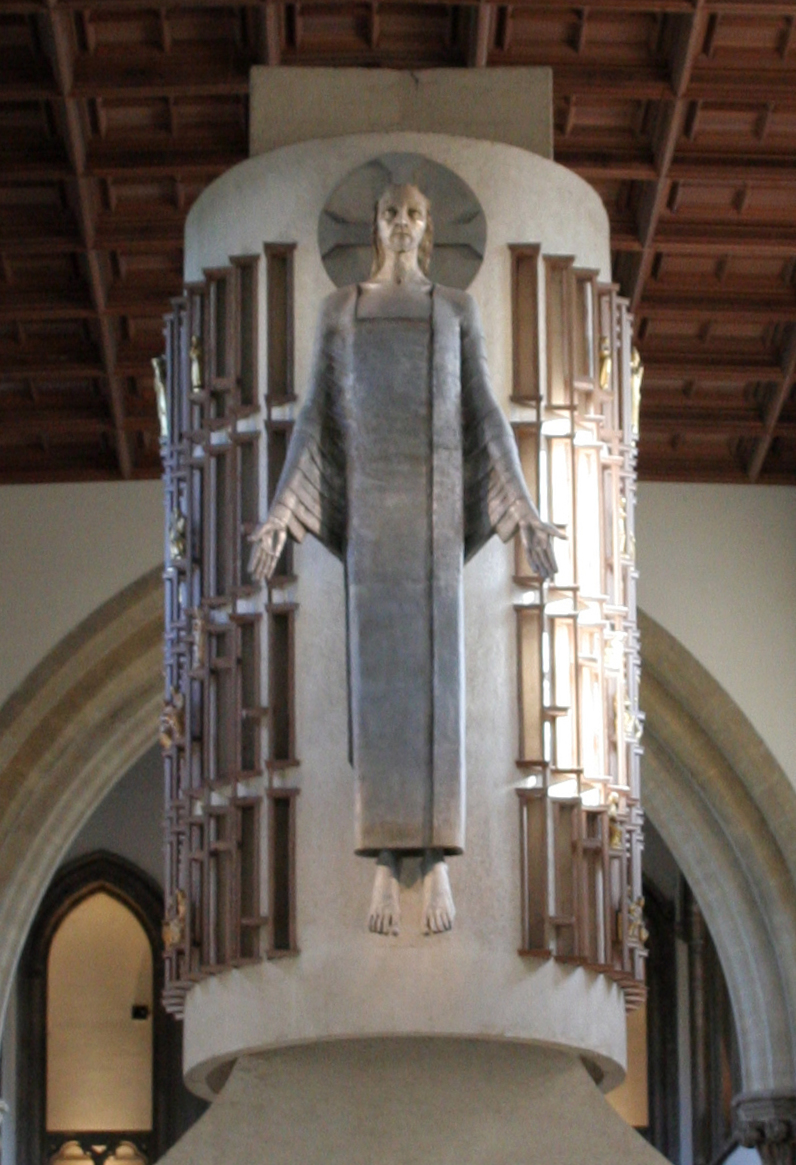
Christ in Majesty, 1954–55

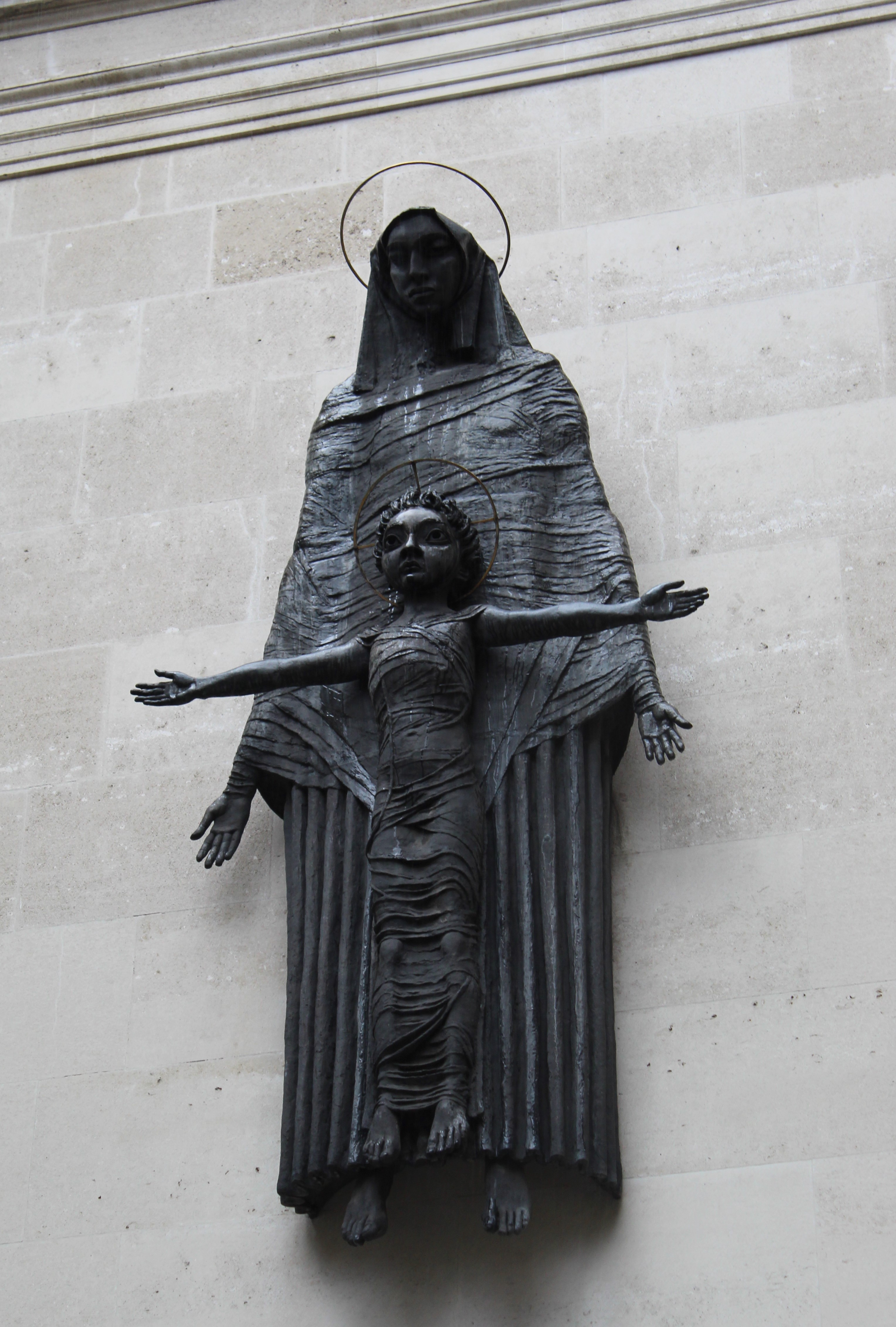
Madonna and Child, 1953

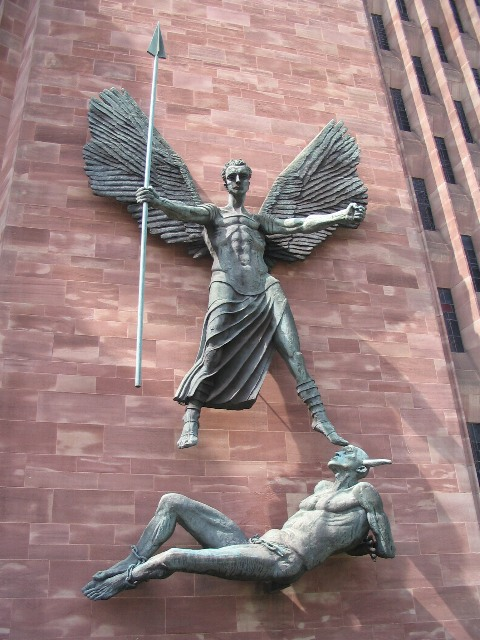
St Michael's Victory over the Devil, 1958

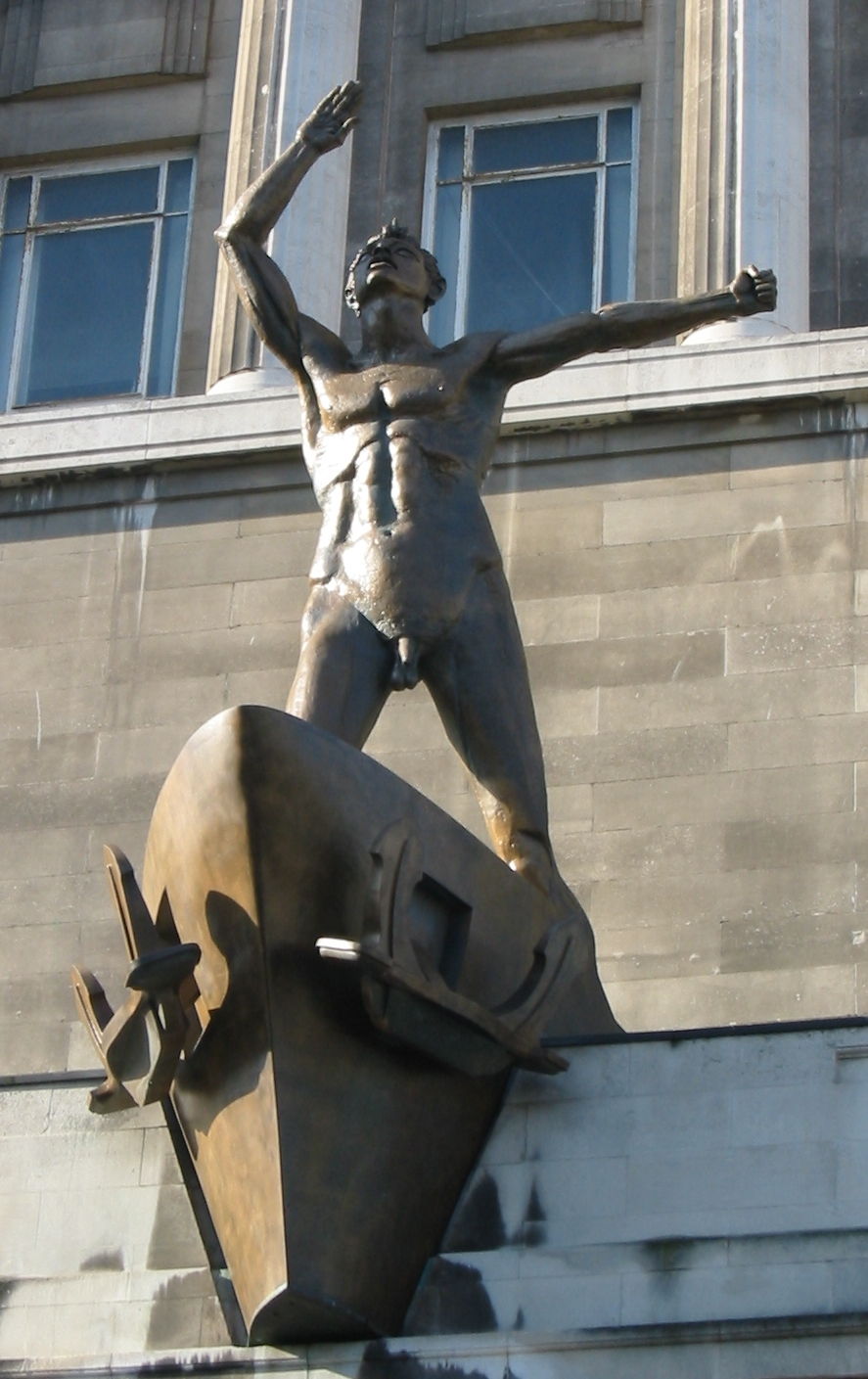
Liverpool Resurgent, 1956

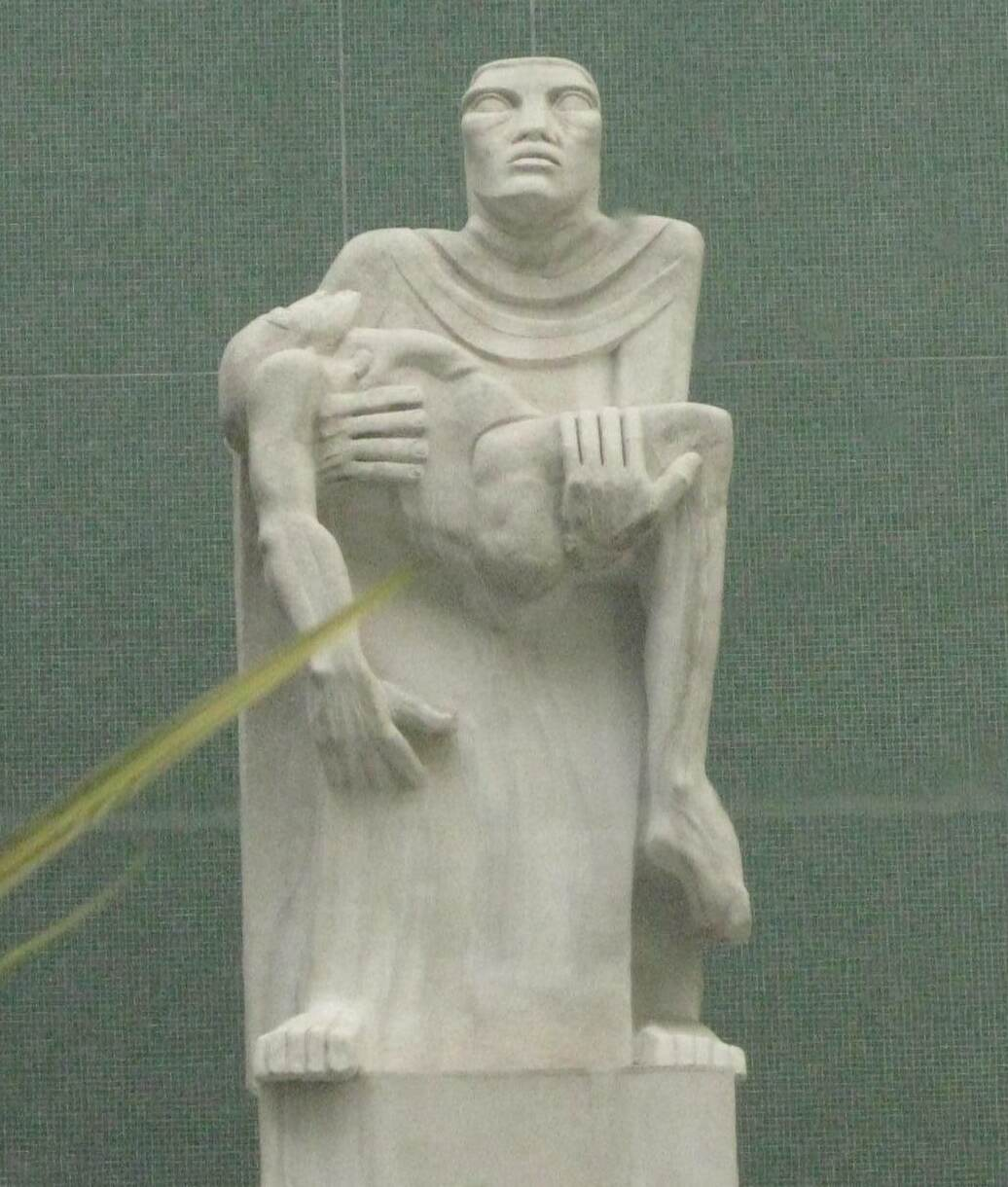
Trades Union Congress War Memorial, 1955

=== Final works ===
The success of Madonna and Child in 1953 led to a dramatic reappraisal of Epstein's work in general and to more public commissions. That year he received commissions from Llandaff Cathedral in Cardiff and, from the British Government, a commission for a statue of Field Marshall Jan Smuts to be placed in Parliament Square. Such was the scale and quantity of work Epstein took on, he was given the use of an extra large studio in the Royal College of Art. There he worked on the three large figure groups comprising Social Consciousness during 1953, the Liverpool Resurgent figure and parts of the giant Christ in Majesty for Llandaff Cathedral. The cathedral had originally commissioned the figure to be made in gilded plaster but after Epstein offered to pay for it to be cast in metal, the church authorities agreed to cover the cost of an aluminium casting. It was not until April 1957 that Christ in Majesty was unveiled, suspended above the nave of the cathedral on a concrete arch designed by George Pace.

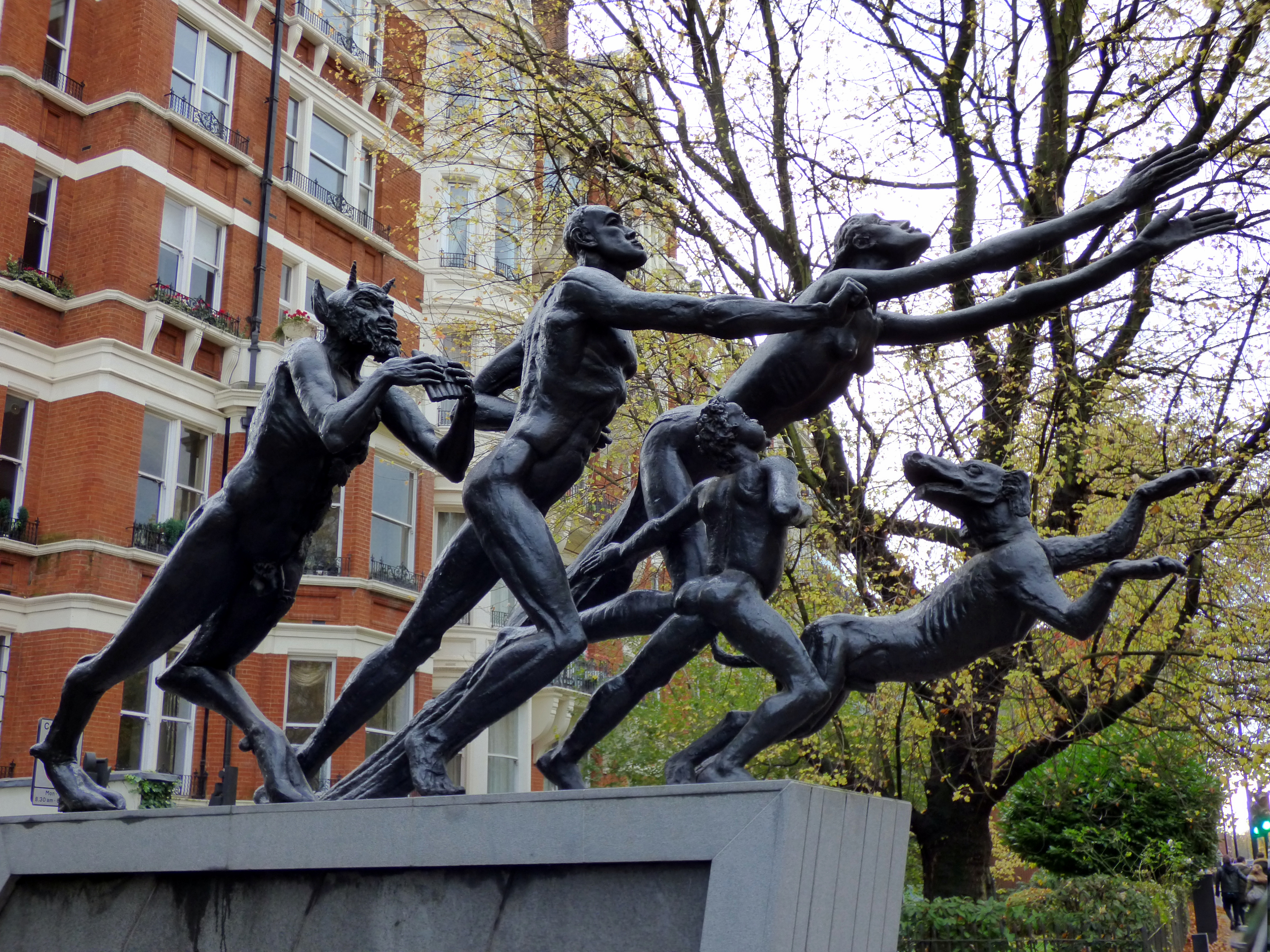
The Bowater House Group, also known as Rush of Green, 1959, unveiled 1961

Epstein was appointed a Knight Commander of the Order of the British Empire in the 1954 New Year Honours. Epstein strongly suspected that Winston Churchill had nominated him for the honor. In 1955, he received a request from Basil Spence, the architect building the new Coventry Cathedral, to produce a small maquette for a giant sculpture of St Michael's Victory over the Devil; he also received a commission from the Trades Union Congress, TUC, for a war memorial for their new headquarters building. The following year, Westminster Abbey commissioned a memorial to William Blake for Poet's Corner. As soon as he finished the maquette for Coventry Cathedral, Epstein began making the head and wings of the full-size figure without waiting for the cathedral authorities to approve the project. When reports of the work appeared in the press, Spence made it clear to Epstein that the cathedral was under no obligation to accept it. Epstein said he would do it for his own benefit. When the bishop and cathedral officials visited Epstein's studio to view the work they were greatly impressed and quickly approved the contract for the work. In a 1956 letter to a friend, Epstein wrote that he was "inundated with requests for work on buildings, large works which I don't know I will ever be able to accomplish. I was for so long without any commissions, I don't feel like turning down anything that comes my way, but it is all coming too late I'm afraid."

During 1958, Epstein was too ill to attend the unveiling of the war memorial he had carved at the centre of the TUC Headquarters in London, being in hospital with pleurisy and a thrombosis. While the TUC leadership made no secret of their hatred of the carving, several Labour MPs were greatly impressed and the critic Terence Mulally praised it as "a tragic monument on a grand scale." After spending time convalescing in Italy and France, Epstein resumed working, creating a portrait sculpture of Princess Margaret and starting work on the large Bowater House Group sculpture. Epstein's final works included a posthumous portrait of David Lloyd George for the Houses of Parliament and the Bowater House Group, which he completed on the day he died in August 1959.

=== Personal life ===
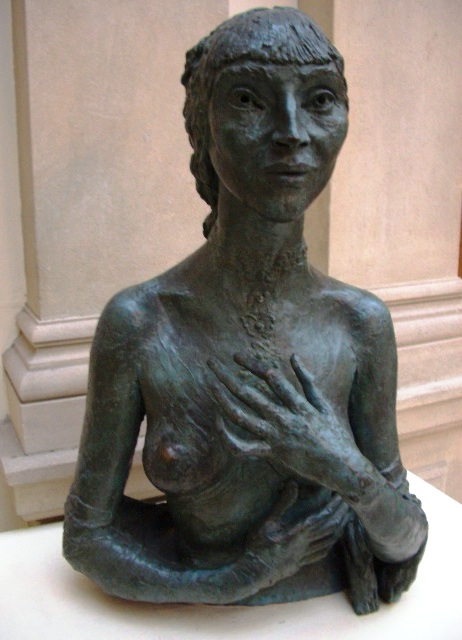
Kathleen [Garman], 1935

Despite being married to and continuing to live with Margaret Dunlop, Epstein had a number of relationships with other women that brought him his five children: Peggy Jean (1918–2010), Theodore Garman, known as Theo, (1924–1954), Kitty Garman (1926–2011), Esther (1929–1954) and Jackie (1934–2009). In 1921, Epstein began the longest of these relationships, with Kathleen Garman, one of the Garman sisters, mother of his three middle children, which continued until his death. Margaret tolerated Epstein's infidelities, allowed his models and lovers to live in the family home and raised Epstein's first child, Peggy Jean, who was the daughter of Meum Lindsell, one of Epstein's previous lovers, and his last, Jackie, whose mother was the painter Isabel Nicholas. Evidently, Margaret's tolerance did not extend to Epstein's relationship with Kathleen Garman, as in 1922 Margaret shot and wounded Kathleen in the shoulder.

Margaret Epstein died in 1947 and he married Kathleen Garman in 1955. Their eldest daughter, also named Kathleen but known as "Kitty", married the painter Lucian Freud in 1948 and was the mother of his daughters Annie and Annabel. She is the subject of Freud's painting Portrait of Kitty. In 1953 they divorced. She married a second time in 1955, to economist Wynne Godley. They have one daughter.

== Death and legacy ==
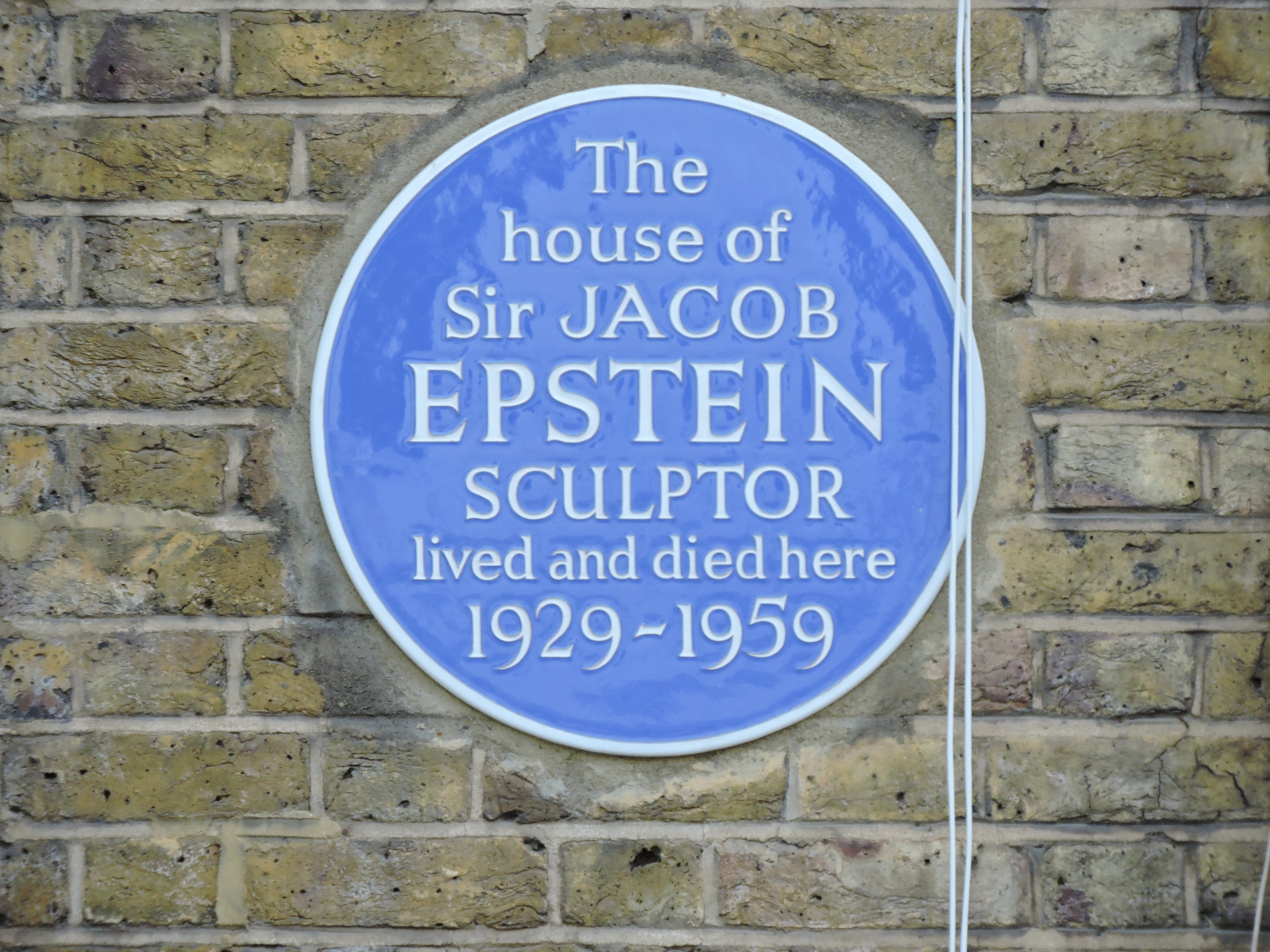
Blue plaque located at 18 Hyde Park Gate, London SW7 5DH

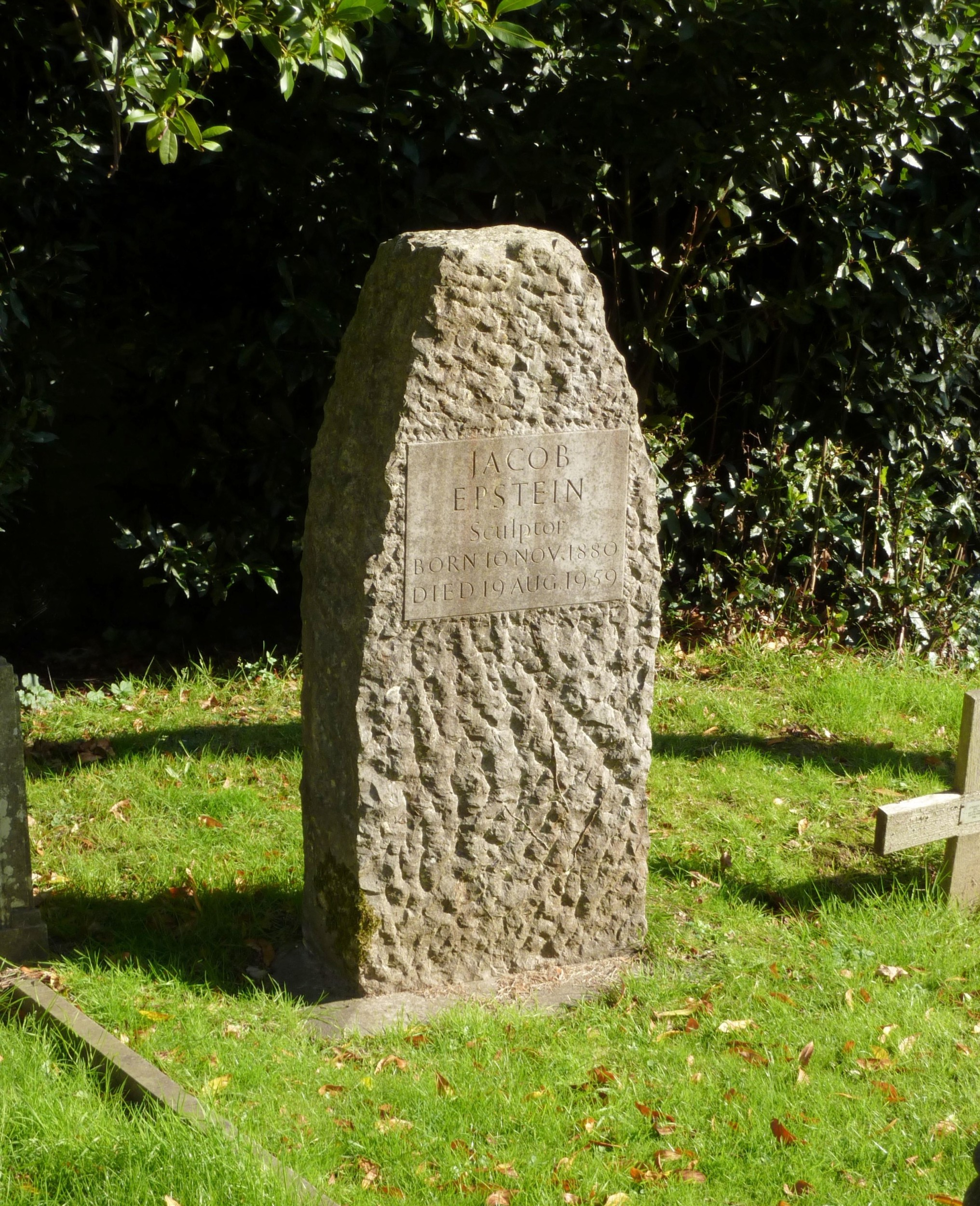
Epstein's grave at Putney Vale Cemetery, London

Epstein died in August 1959 at his Hyde Park Gate home and was interred in Putney Vale Cemetery on 24 August 1959 with a service conducted by Dr Hewlett Johnson, Dean of Canterbury. A memorial service was held on 10 November 1959 at St Paul's Cathedral with a plaster cast of Christ in Majesty hung in the cathedral for the event. His widow explained why she had buried her Jewish husband in a Christian cemetery: "I chose Putney Vale because of its trees. I did not want to affront Jewish people so I asked a rabbi if he would bury my husband in Christian ground bit [sic] according to the Jewish faith. He said he would not bury him in ground that was not consecrated Jewish. So we had what is called a non-denominational [sic] service."

A memorial exhibition of 170 sculptures by Epstein was held during the Edinburgh Festival in 1961. The exhibition included the four works that had been at Blackpool in Louis Tussaud's shows. After Epstein died the four works, Jacob and the Angel, Adam, Consummatum Est and Genesis, were bought by a group led by Lord Harewood and Jack Lyons. Adam is now in the entrance hall of Harewood House, Consummatum Est is in the Scottish National Gallery of Modern Art and Genesis is at The Whitworth in Manchester. Since 1996, Jacob and the Angel has been part of the Tate collection alongside several other works by Epstein including Sun God / Primeval Gods, a version of Doves and Torso in Metal.

In 1961, two hundred plaster casts by Epstein were donated by Kathleen Garman to the Israel Museum in Jerusalem. With Epstein's former pupil Sally Ryan, Garman created the Garman Ryan Collection, a collection of works by Epstein and other artists that she donated, in 1973, to the people of Walsall, and are now exhibited at The New Art Gallery Walsall. Ryan also donated Epstein's 1927 seated bronze Madonna and Child, which she had bought in the 1930s, to the Riverside Church, New York City in 1960.

By 1912, Epstein had begun collecting west African, ancient Egyptian, pre-Columbian American, Oceanic and other non-western artworks, having purchased pieces of Fang work, including a reliquary figure, in Paris that year. By 1931 he owned over 200 pieces of ethnographic art and, eventually, built up one of the largest such private collections in existence with over a thousand objects. After his death, when the collection was broken up and sold at auction, the British Museum purchased several substantial pieces.

Epstein's art is to be found all over the world. Highly original for its time, it substantially influenced the younger generation of sculptors such as Henry Moore and Barbara Hepworth. According to June Rose's biography, during the early 1920s Moore visited Epstein in his studio and was befriended by the older sculptor. Epstein, Moore, and Hepworth all expressed deep fascination with non-western art in the British Museum.

== Selected major pieces ==
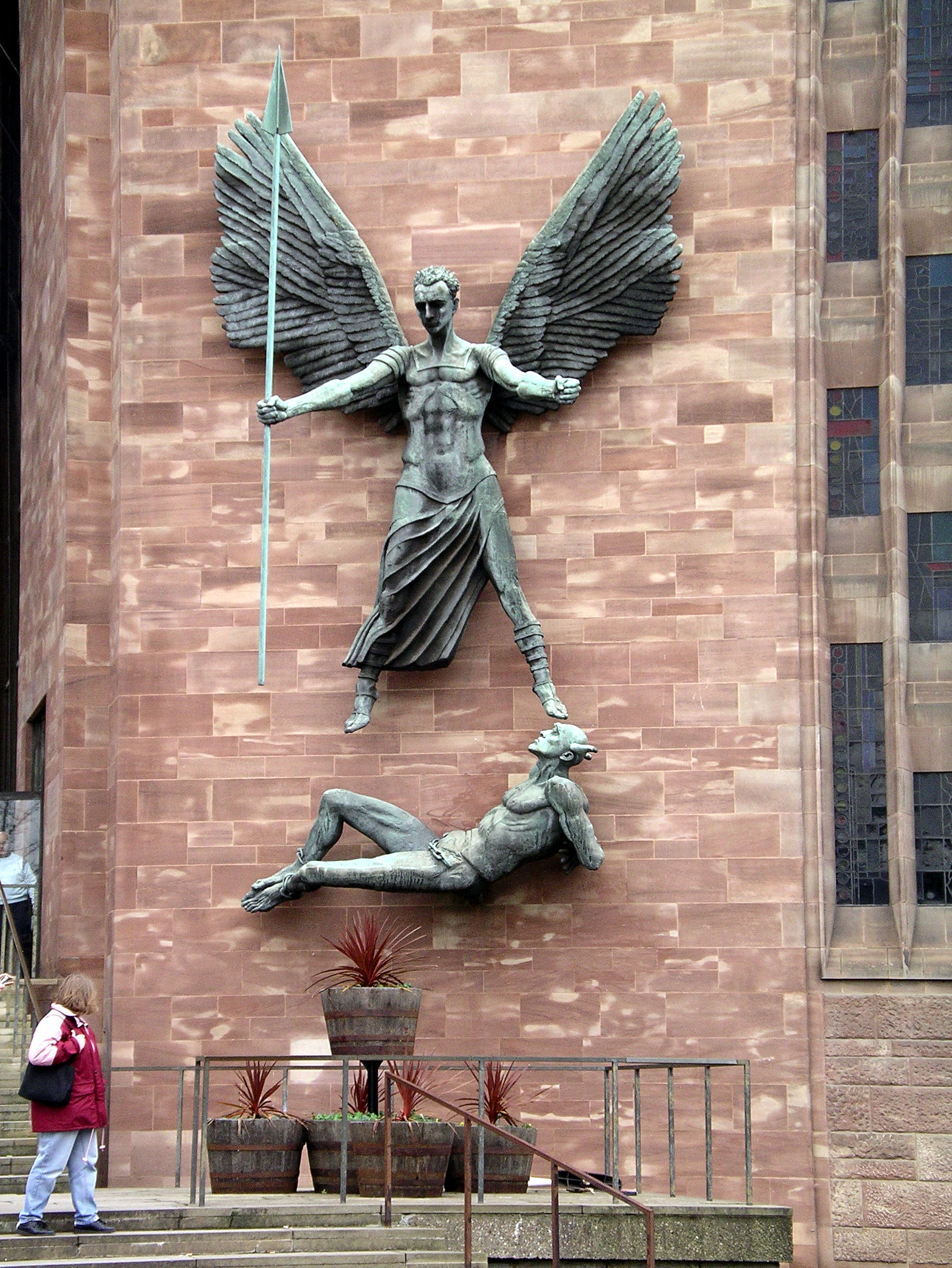
St Michael's Victory over the Devil (1958), on the new Coventry Cathedral

For a more comprehensive list, see List of sculptures by Jacob Epstein.

- 1907–08 Ages of Man – British Medical Association headquarters, Strand, London – mutilated / destroyed 1937
- 1910 Rom – limestone – portrait of Romily John – National Museum Cardiff, Cardiff
- 1911–12 Oscar Wilde's tomb – Père Lachaise Cemetery, Paris
- 1913–14 Rock Drill – bronze — Tate Collection (symbolising 'the terrible Frankenstein's monster we have made ourselves into')
- 1917 Venus – marble – Yale University Art Gallery, New Haven, Connecticut
- 1919 Christ – bronze – Wheathampstead, England
- 1921 Bust of Jacob Kramer – Leeds Art Gallery
- 1922–30 Head of Hans Kindler – Kemper Art Museum, St. Louis, MO
- 1924–25 Rima – W. H. Hudson Memorial, Hyde Park, London
- 1926 bronze bust of Ramsay MacDonald – Palace of Westminster, London
- 1927 Madonna and Child – seated bronze – donated to the Riverside Church, New York City in 1960
- 1928–29 Night and Day – Portland stone – 55 Broadway, St. James', London
- 1933 Head of Albert Einstein – bronze – numerous casts
- 1939 Adam – alabaster – Harewood House, near Leeds
- 1940–41 Jacob and the Angel – alabaster – Tate Britain
- 1944– 45 Lucifer – bronze – Birmingham Museum and Art Gallery
- 1947–48 Lazarus – Hopton Wood Stone– chapel of New College, Oxford
- 1950 Madonna and Child – lead – Convent of the Holy Child Jesus, London
- 1954 Social Consciousness – University of Pennsylvania, Philadelphia
- 1954–55 Christ in Majesty – 5.5m aluminium figure – Llandaff Cathedral, Cardiff
- 1956 Liverpool Resurgent – Lewis's Building, Liverpool
- 1956 statue of Field Marshall Jan Smuts – bronze – Parliament Square, London
- 1957 bust of William Blake – Westminster Abbey, London
- 1958 Trade Union Victims of Two World Wars – The Spirit of Trade Unionism – stone – Congress House, London
- 1958 St Michael's Victory over the Devil – bronze – Coventry Cathedral
- 1959 The Rush of Green (also known as Pan or The Bowater House Group) – Hyde Park, London
- After 1959 Christ in Majesty – gilded plaster – Riverside Church, New York City

== Bibliography ==
- Epstein, Jacob, The sculptor speaks: Jacob Epstein to Arnold L. Haskell, a series of conversations on art (London: W. Heinemann, 1931)
- Epstein, Jacob, Let there be sculpture: an autobiography (London: Michael Joseph, 1940)
