= The Spirit of the Ghetto =

1902 book by Hutchins Hapgood

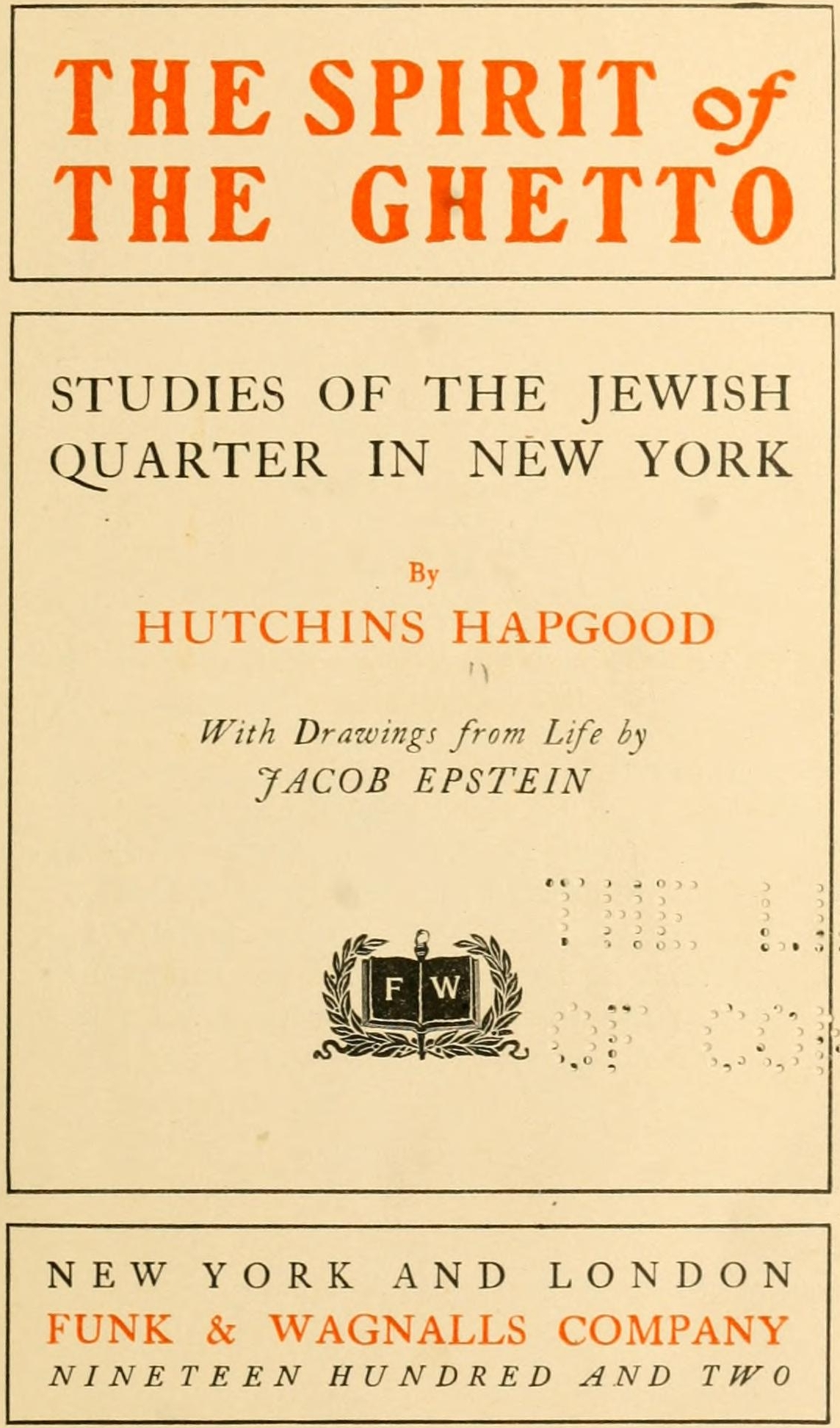
- Author: Hutchins Hapgood
- Publisher: Funk & Wagnalls
- Publication date: 1902

The Spirit of the Ghetto: Studies of the Jewish Quarter in New York is a 1902 book by Hutchins Hapgood about the lives of Jews in New York City. Originally published by Funk & Wagnalls and illustrated by Jacob Epstein, Harvard's Belknap Press reissued the book in 1967.

== Bibliography ==
- Brandes, Joseph (1967). "Review of The Spirit of the Ghetto: Studies of the Jewish Quarter of New York". The International Migration Review. 2 (1): 61–63. doi:10.2307/3002614. ISSN 0197-9183. JSTOR 3002614.
- Glanz, Rudolf (1967). "Review of The Spirit of the Ghetto". New York History. 48 (2): 205–206. ISSN 0146-437X. JSTOR 23162592.
- Goelman, Elazar (1967). "Review of The Spirit of the Ghetto: Studies of the Jewish Quarter of New York, with Drawings from Life by Jacob Epstein". Jewish Social Studies. 29 (4): 248–249. ISSN 0021-6704. JSTOR 4466366.
- Meyer, Isidore S. (1970). "Review of The Spirit of the Ghetto". American Jewish Historical Quarterly. 59 (4): 545–548. ISSN 0002-9068. JSTOR 23878145.
- Mudrick, Marvin (1972). "Here They Are". The Hudson Review. 25 (2): 338–349. doi:10.2307/3849009. ISSN 0018-702X. JSTOR 3849009.
- Tolbert, Charles M. (1968). "Review of The Spirit of the Ghetto". Journal of Church and State. 10 (2): 322. doi:10.1093/jcs/10.2.322. ISSN 0021-969X. JSTOR 23914087.
