= Garman =

Garman is a surname or first name. Notable people with the name include:

== Sports ==
- Ann Garman, All-American Girls Professional Baseball League player
- Judi Garman (born 1954), American softball coach
- Mike Garman (born 1949), American baseball player
- Ralph Garman (born 1964), actor

== Science and technology ==
- Elspeth Garman, crystallographer
- Harrison Garman (1856–1944), American entomologist
- Samuel Garman, naturalist/zoologist/herpetologist from Pennsylvania
- Jack Garman, key figure during the Apollo 11 lunar landing

== Other ==
- Garman sisters, bohemian English family, associated with the Bloomsbury set, and including:
  - Kathleen Garman, Lady Epstein (1901–1971)
  - Lorna Garman (1911–2000)
  - Mary Garman (1898–1979)
- Douglas Garman, British Communist Party Education Secretary, writer and publisher; brother of the Garman sisters

== Mythological ==
- Garman mac Bomma Licce, figure in Irish myth

== See also ==
- German, Iran
- Garmin
