= List of Bloomsbury Group people =

This is a list of people associated with the Bloomsbury Group. Much about the group is controversial, including its membership: it has been said that "the three words 'the Bloomsbury group' have been so much used as to have become almost unusable".

== Group of friends and relatives that became a movement ==
The Bloomsbury group started as a loose collective of friends and relatives living near Bloomsbury in London. Some of them knew each other from their time as students in Cambridge. Around World War I most of its key members had left the Bloomsbury area, where some of them later returned.

The members of the Bloomsbury Group denied being a group in any formal sense, they however shared common values, among which was a strong belief in the arts.

=== Core members ===
The group had ten core members:

- Clive Bell, art critic
- Vanessa Bell, post-impressionist painter
- E. M. Forster, fiction writer
- Roger Fry, art critic and post-impressionist painter
- Duncan Grant, post-impressionist painter, who later became a member of the Camden Town Group
- John Maynard Keynes, economist
- Desmond MacCarthy, literary journalist
- Lytton Strachey, biographer
- Leonard Woolf, essayist and non-fiction writer
- Virginia Woolf, fiction writer and essayist

=== Included according to Leonard Woolf ===
In the 1960s, Leonard Woolf additionally listed the following Bloomsbury Group members:

- "Old Bloomsbury":
  - Adrian Stephen
  - Karin Stephen
  - Saxon Sydney-Turner
  - Mary (Molly) MacCarthy
- Later additions:
  - Julian Bell
  - Quentin Bell
  - Angelica Bell
  - David Garnett

=== Mentioned in various sources as included in the Bloomsbury Group ===
Various sources include the following:

- Lady Ottoline Morrell
- Dora Carrington
- James Strachey
- Alix Strachey
- Lydia Lopokova, Keynes' wife, accepted in the group

== Generally not seen as members of the Bloomsbury Group ==
=== Died before the group really existed ===
- Thoby Stephen, brother to key members Adrian Stephen, Virginia Woolf and Vanessa Bell

=== Omega Workshops ===
Roger Fry and other Bloomsbury Group artists such as Vanessa Bell and Duncan Grant were involved in the Omega Workshops, a business which traded from 1913 to 1919. Other designers and manufacturers at the Workshops were not necessarily members of the Bloomsbury Group.

=== Ottoline Morrell circle ===
The Bloomsbury Group only partially identified with Lady Ottoline Morrell, but attended her parties at Garsington Manor. Others present:

- L. P. Hartley
- Eardley Knollys
- Philip Morrell
- Aldous Huxley and his wife Maria Nys

=== Hogarth Press ===
Hogarth Press was the publishing house owned by Leonard and Virginia Woolf after they had left the Bloomsbury area in 1917. Staff members and authors published by that company were not necessarily part of the Bloomsbury Group. The following are generally not seen as part of the Bloomsbury Group:

- Published by Hogarth Press:
  - T. S. Eliot
  - Katherine Mansfield
  - Vita Sackville-West, "Hogarth Press's best-selling author"
  - Julia Strachey, Lytton Stratchey's niece
- Hogarth Press personnel:
  - John Lehmann, later starting his own publishing company

=== LGBT extended groups ===
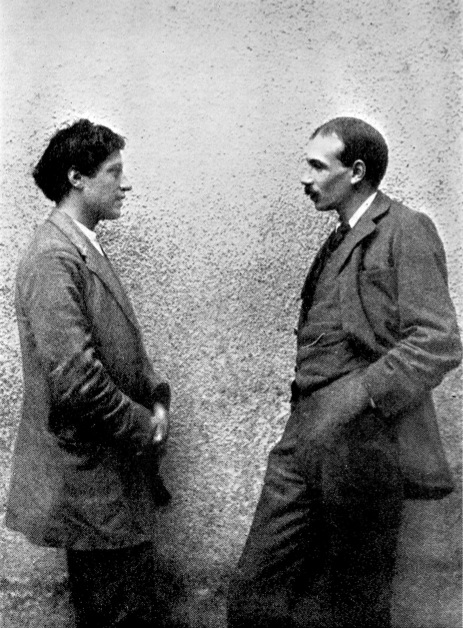
Duncan Grant and Maynard Keynes

The Bloomsbury Group plays a prominent role in the LGBT history of its day. While still in the Bloomsbury area, LGBT activity was all very much in a single group (e.g. Duncan Grant, a homosexual with bisexual leanings, having affairs with Maynard Keynes, James Strachey, Adrian Stephen, David Garnett and straight Vanessa Bell). Names of LGBT people outside the Bloomsbury Group strictly speaking include:

- Mary Garman
- Nina Hamnett
- Jane Ellen Harrison
- Rupert Brooke
- Arthur Hobhouse

Later the groups differentiated. Keynes married Lopokova, and no longer belonged to any of the LGBT groups. Other groups more or less split according to the location of the members:

- Lady Ottoline Morrell provided housing for Aldous Huxley at Garsington where he was married to Maria Nys after the war.
- Also Duncan Grant and David Garnett had to work on the land as conscientious objectors during World War I. They started living with Vanessa Bell (also her sons Julian and Quentin) in Charleston Farmhouse:
  - Francis Birrell started a bookshop together with David Garnett later on.

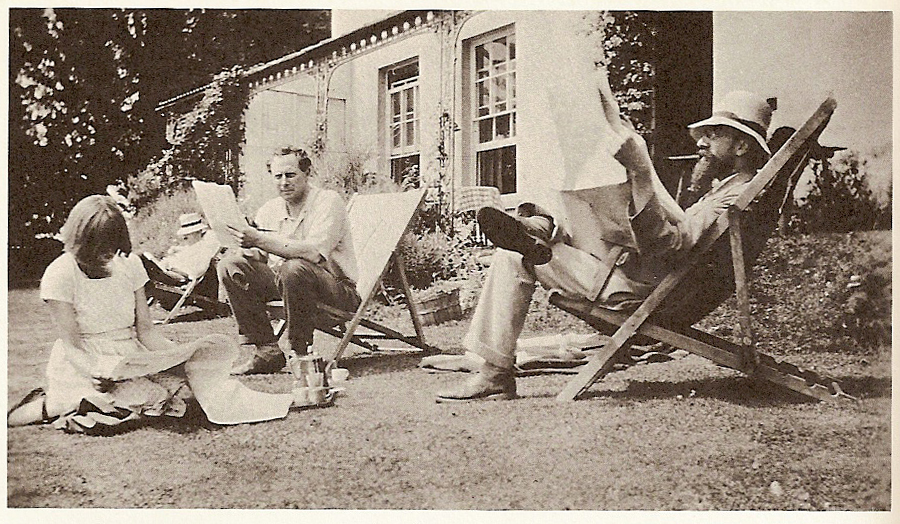
Dora Carrington, Ralph Partridge and Lytton Stratchey at Ham Spray House

- Also during the First World War, Lytton Strachey and Dora Carrington moved to Tidmarsh Mill House, Berkshire. Later (in a ménage à trois with straight Ralph Partridge) they moved to Ham Spray House, Wiltshire.
  - Roger Senhouse was Lytton Strachey's last lover.
- E. M. Forster spent his time as conscientious objector in Egypt, and remained there some time after the First World War. When returning to England his circle of LGBT friends and acquaintances included:
  - W. J. H. Sprott
  - J. R. Ackerley
  - Christopher Isherwood
  - Siegfried Sassoon
  - Forrest Reid
  - Benjamin Britten

After Virginia Woolf had moved to Monk's House, East Sussex, she met Vita Sackville-West, writing her roman à clef Orlando: A Biography about her. Woolf also met the LGBT people around her, including:

- Harold Nicolson, Sackville-West's husband
- Benedict Nicolson, their son
- Violet Trefusis, her former lover
- Ethel Smyth, another later acquaintance of Virginia Woolf
- Katherine Mansfield and John Lehmann, LGBT acquaintances linked to the publishing company she owned with her husband (Hogarth Press).

=== Others ===
Others not generally considered part of the Bloomsbury Group properly speaking (some of them only befriended individual group members, not or only partially sharing their views or not in the same creative mindset):

- Bernard Meninsky
- Mulk Raj Anand
- Garman sisters, Lorna and Kathleen
- Jacques and Gwen Raverat (continued letter exchanges with Virginia Woolf after moving to France)
- Bertrand Russell
- Arthur Waley
- Hugh Walpole
- G. E. Moore
- Ann Bridge
- Frances Partridge married Ralph Partridge after Lytton Stratchey's and Dora Carrington's deaths and continued living in Ham Spray house.

=== Later offspring ===
Too young to be part of the original Bloomsbury group:

- Nigel Nicolson, son of Harold Nicolson and Vita Sackville-West, also biographer of Virginia Woolf
- Cressida Bell, daughter of Quentin Bell
- Burgo Partridge, son of Dora Carrington's widower, who later married Angelica and David Garnett's second daughter Henrietta

=== Critics of Bloomsbury ===
- Wyndham Lewis
- Roy Campbell (poet)
- D. H. Lawrence criticised the homosexual tendencies, though close to the core members of the group.

== Bibliography ==
- Todd Avery. Radio Modernism: Literature, Ethics, and the BBC, 1922-1938. Ashgate Publishing, Ltd.; 1 January 2006. ISBN 978-0-7546-5517-6.
- Peter Clarke. Keynes. Bloomsbury Press, 2009. pp. 56, 57. ISBN 978-1-60819-023-2.
- Angelica Garnett. Deceived with Kindness (1984)
- Hermione Lee, Virginia Woolf London: Chatto & Windus, 1996.
- Ian Ousby ed., The Cambridge Guide to Literature in English (Cambridge 1995)
- Souhami, Diana (1997). Mrs. Keppel and Her Daughter. Portrait of a Lesbian Affair: St. Martin's Griffin. pp. 123–223. ISBN 978-0-312-19517-5. "denys trefusis and violet trefusis."
- Frances Spalding. Virginia Woolf: Paper Darts: the Illustrated Letters (1991)
