= Voorslag =

South African literary journal (1926-27)

Voorslag (Whiplash) was a literary journal published in Durban, South Africa in 1926 and 1927. It was the first modern small magazine in South Africa and was subtitled "A Magazine of South African Life and Art". The magazine was founded by Roy Campbell and William Plomer; Laurens van der Post was invited to become its Afrikaans correspondent. Campbell served as the publication's editor for three issues before resigning due to interference from his proprietor, Lewis Reynolds; Reynolds discouraged Voorslag's criticism of the colonial system.
