= Gordon Anthony =

British photographer

Anthony in 1988.

Gordon Anthony (23 December 1902 – 21 July 1989) was a British photographer, known particularly for his photographs of ballet and theatre in Britain.

== Biography ==
He was born James Gordon Dawson Stannus in Wicklow, Ireland on 23 December 1902.

Anthony started working in photography in 1926, making images of the students at his sister's ballet school in London.

In 1933 he became the portrait photographer to the Shakespeare Memorial Theatre, Stratford. His photographs helped to make the Royal Ballet known across the world in the 1930s. In 1948, he published the first ever book of colour photography in Great Britain, Studies of Dancers.

A retrospective exhibition of his work, Shadowlands, was held at the National Portrait Gallery in 1988.

== Family ==
His sister, Dame Ninette de Valois, was a ballet dancer in Diaghilev's company. She later directed both the Sadler's Wells and the Royal Ballet.

== Works ==
Anthony's photographs are held in major collection including the Victoria and Albert Museum and the National Portrait Gallery. Among his portraits are the economist John Maynard Keynes, the actors Alec Guinness, Peggy Ashcroft and John Gielgud, and critic Sacheverell Sitwell, theatre director Lilian Baylis, sculptor Jacob Epstein's wife Kathleen Garman and dancers Margot Fonteyn and Alicia Markova.

Books

- Ballet: Camera Studies (Geoffrey Bles, 1939)
- Studies of Dancers (1948)
- Margot Fonteyn (1950)
- Alicia Markova (1951)
- A Camera at the Ballet: Pioneer Dancers of the Royal Ballet (1975)
