= Kathleen Garman =

British model

Kathleen Garman Lady Epstein
- Kathleen Garman in 1921
- Born: 15 May 1901; Wednesbury, Staffordshire, England
- Died: August 1979 (age 78); London, England
- Known for: One of the Garman sisters; member of the Bloomsbury Group
- Spouse: Jacob Epstein (m. 1954–1959)
- Children: Theodore Garman (1924–1954); Kitty Garman (1926–2011); Esther Grace (1929–1954)

Kathleen Esther Garman, Lady Epstein (15 May 1901 – August 1979) was the third of the seven Garman sisters, who were high-profile members of artistic circles in mid-20th century London, renowned for their beauty and scandalous behaviour. She was the model and longtime mistress of British/American sculptor Jacob Epstein, and eventually his second wife. They met in 1921 and immediately began a relationship that lasted until Epstein's death and produced three of Epstein's five children. Their daughter, Kitty Garman, was the first wife of Lucian Freud; their son was the artist Theodore Garman.

== Early life ==
Kathleen Garman was born on 15 May 1901 in Wednesbury, Staffordshire, the daughter of Dr Walter Chancellor Garman (1860–1923), a general practitioner, and his wife, Margaret Frances Magill. She was one of nine children, seven sisters and two brothers: Mary (1898), Sylvia (1899), Kathleen (1901), Douglas (1903), Rosalind (1904), Helen (1906), Mavin (1907), Ruth (1909) and Lorna (1911). The family lived at Oakeswell Hall, Wednesbury.

Kathleen took music lessons at the Birmingham and Midland Institute, and art classes in Birmingham with her sister Mary. In 1919 the sisters decided to run away to London. Kathleen was employed by Harrods, helping with the horses that pulled the delivery carriages, and also worked as an artist's model. Mary drove a delivery van. Shocked by their behaviour, their father eventually decided to support them. They rented a studio apartment at 13 Regent Square, Camden, and enrolled in a private art school. At night they frequented West End clubs such as The Gargoyle, The Harlequin, and The Cave of the Golden Calf. It was at the Harlequin that Kathleen met the 40-year-old Epstein, who invited her to his table and asked her to pose for him. Mary ended up marrying the South African poet Roy Campbell. Kathleen, Mary, and Lorna were all to become bohemian members of what became known as the Bloomsbury Group. In 1936 Kathleen was photographed by Gordon Anthony.

== Relationship with Jacob Epstein ==
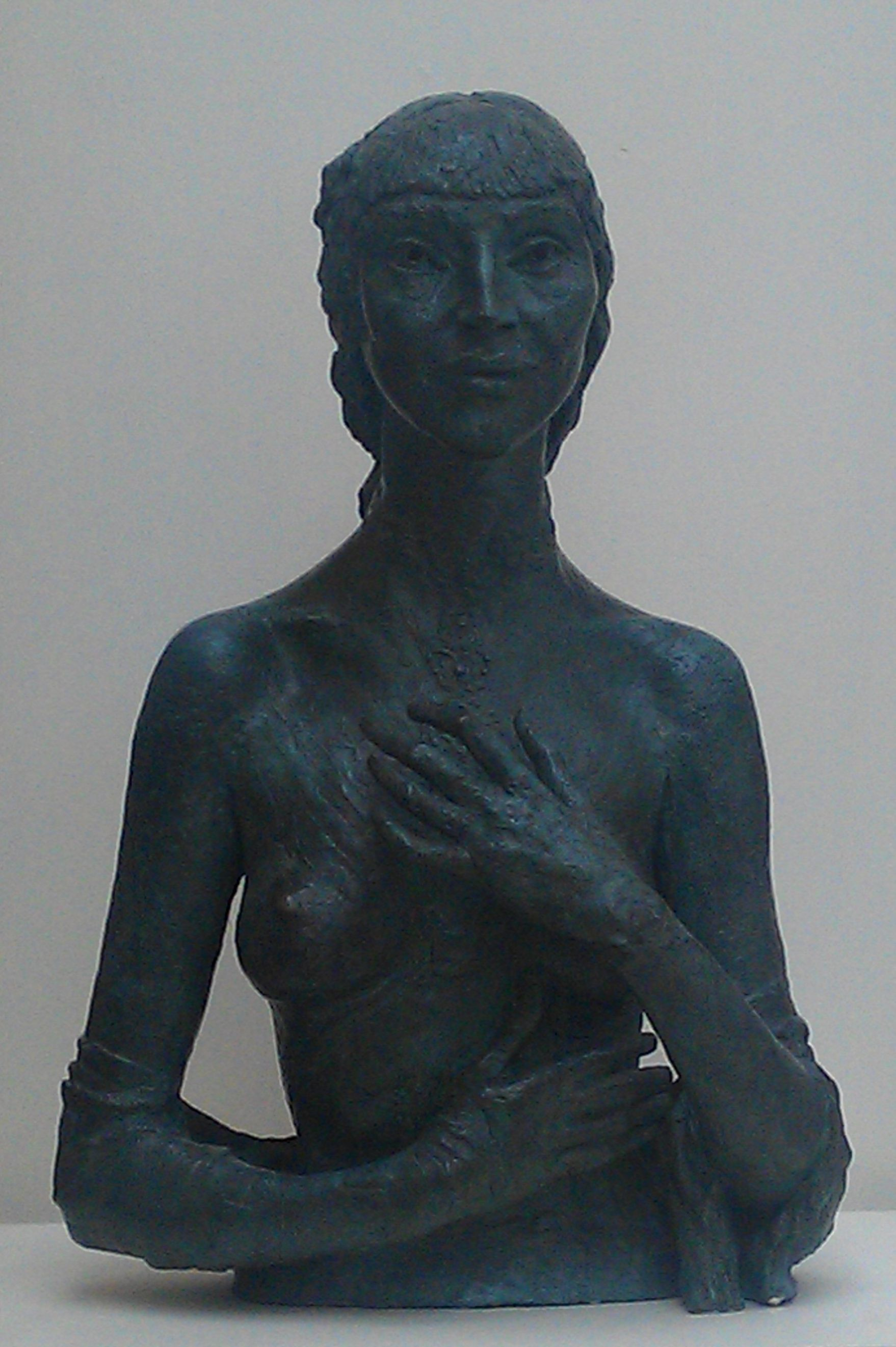
Bronze sculpture of Kathleen Garman by Jacob Epstein, titled Kathleen and made in 1935, while she was his mistress, now at Bristol City Museum and Art Gallery

In 1921, Kathleen began a relationship with the married sculptor Jacob Epstein, becoming his model and his mistress. Her father, who strongly disapproved of the affair, cut her out of his will when he died in 1923. In 1923, Epstein's jealous wife Margaret invited Kathleen to her house and shot her in the shoulder with a pearl-handled pistol. Epstein paid Kathleen's hospital bills and persuaded her not to press charges against Margaret, lest it erupt into a public scandal. After this incident, Margaret encouraged Jacob into multiple affairs in the hope he would tire of Kathleen. While Epstein and his wife were childless, Margaret raised as their own his children from other liaisons, his daughter Peggy Jean (b. 1918) (with Dorothy (Meum) Lindsell-Stewart [1895–1957]), and his son Jackie (b. 1934) (with Isabel Nicholas [1912–1992]).

Kathleen and Epstein continued to see each other, having three children together in 1924, 1926, and 1929. They married in June 1955, in a private ceremony at Fulham Register Office, London, eight years after Margaret's death. Upon their marriage, Kathleen became Lady Epstein and his sole beneficiary. After his death in 1959, she donated his works of art to the Israel Museum. Other art pieces by Epstein were incorporated into the Garman Ryan Collection, together with the works of Sally Ryan, an American sculptor who left her artworks and $50,000 in cash to Kathleen in 1968. She died in August 1979.

== Children ==
Kathleen's three children with Jacob Epstein were:

- Theodore Garman (1924–1954) was a successful artist, but suffered from mental instability, diagnosed as schizophrenia. It was said on his death, shortly before his 30th birthday, that he had "destroyed most of his canvasses in fits of depression."
- Kitty Garman (1926–2011) was the first wife of the artist Lucian Freud. She became his muse after being introduced to him by her aunt Lorna. They married in 1948 and had two daughters.
- Esther Grace Garman (1929–1954) was very close to her elder brother and committed suicide six months after his death.

== See also ==
- Dolores (model)
- Garman sisters
- List of Bloomsbury Group people
