= Roy Campbell (poet) =

South African poet (1901–1957)

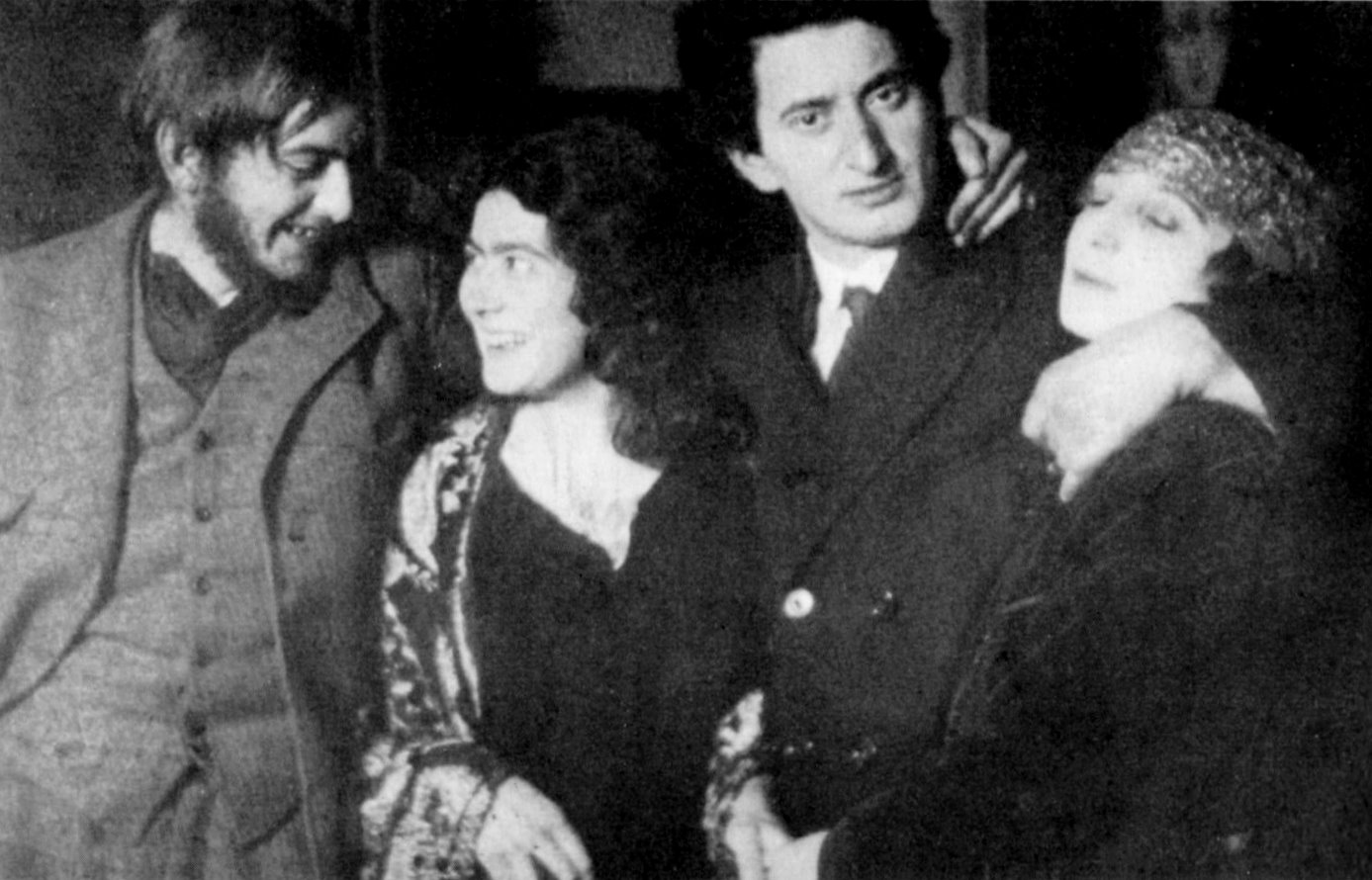
- (Left to right) Roy Campbell, Mary Campbell, Jacob Kramer, and Dolores, 1920s
- Born: Ignatius Royston Dunnachie Campbell; 2 October 1901; Durban, Colony of Natal, British Empire (present-day South Africa)
- Died: 23 April 1957 (aged 55); Setúbal, Portugal
- Occupations: Poet, journalist
- Spouse: Mary Margaret Garman
- Writing career
- Genre: Poetry
- Notable works: The Flaming Terrapin, Adamastor, Flowering Reeds
- Movements: English romantic revival, satire

Ignatius Royston Dunnachie Campbell, better known as Roy Campbell (2 October 1901 – 23 April 1957), was a South African poet, literary critic, literary translator, war poet and satirist. Most of his adult life was spent in Europe.

Born into a white South African family of Scottish descent in Durban, Colony of Natal, Campbell was sent to England to attend Oxford University. Instead, he failed the entrance exam and drifted into London's literary bohemia. Following his marriage to the bohemian Englishwoman Mary Garman, he wrote the well-received poem The Flaming Terrapin which brought the Campbells into the highest circles of British literature.

After experiencing both shunning and social ostracism for supporting racial equality as the editor of the South African literary magazine Voorslag, Campbell returned to England and became involved with the Bloomsbury Group. He ultimately decided that the Bloomsbury Group was snobbish, promiscuous, nihilistic and anti-Christian. He lampooned them in a mock-epic poem called The Georgiad, which damaged his reputation in literary circles. His subsequent conversion to Roman Catholicism in Spain and vocal support for Francisco Franco and the Nationalist faction during the Spanish Civil War caused him to be labelled a fascist by influential left-wing literati, for example George Orwell in 1937. This further damaged his reputation as a poet. He served in the British Army during Second World War and briefly attended meetings of The Inklings during this period, where he befriended C. S. Lewis and J. R. R. Tolkien.

In the post-war period, Campbell continued to write and translate poetry and to lecture. He also joined other White South African writers and intellectuals, including Laurens van der Post, Alan Paton, and Uys Krige, in speaking out against apartheid. Campbell died in a car accident in Portugal on Easter Monday, 1957.

Though Campbell was considered by T. S. Eliot, Dylan Thomas and Edith Sitwell to have been one of the best poets of the period between the First and Second World Wars, the accusation that he was a fascist, which was first promulgated during the 1930s, continues to overshadow his reception, though some literary critics have attempted to rehabilitate his reputation.

== Early life ==
=== Family origins ===
According to Campbell, his family history had been traced out, despite their differing views about the Spanish Civil War, by "that valiant and fine writer, my friend, the late George Orwell."

Campbell's paternal ancestors were Scottish Covenanters and members of Clan Campbell, who left the Gàidhealtachd of Scotland after their Chief, the Earl of Argyll, was defeated in battle by the Royalist Marquess of Montrose in 1645. The Campbell family then settled as part of the Plantation of Ulster at Carndonagh, in Inishowen, County Donegal. During the centuries when they lived in Donegal, the ancestors of the poet were "bog-trotting Scotch-Irish peasants who were tenants of the Kilpatricks, the squires of Carndonagh." Many of the Campbell men were said to have been talented fiddlers. The living standards of the Campbell family improved drastically around 1750, when one of the poet's ancestors eloped with "one of the Kilpatrick girls", whom he had met "while he was fiddling at a ball given by the Squire."

Campbell's grandfather, William Campbell, emigrated to the Colony of Natal with his family aboard from Glasgow in 1850. William Campbell adapted well to life in Africa and built the breakwater that still forms the foundation of the great North Pier in Durban harbour. He also built a large and very successful sugar cane plantation. Campbell's father, Samuel George Campbell, was born in Durban in 1861. In 1878 he travelled to Edinburgh to study medicine. He graduated with honours in 1882 and completed postgraduate work at the Pasteur Institute in Paris; he also studied ear, nose and throat ailments in Vienna. In 1886, Campbell's father returned to Scotland to take his M.D. and to become a Fellow of the Royal College of Surgeons.

While in Scotland, Dr Campbell married Margaret Wylie Dunnachie, daughter of James Dunnachie, of Glenboig, Lanarkshire, a wealthy self-made businessman, and Jean Hendry of Eaglesham. In his memoirs, Campbell alleges: "My maternal grandmother was a Gascon from Bayonne and though I never met her, I inherit through her my love of bulls, and of Provençal, French, and Spanish poetry." According to Campbell, his Dunnachie ancestors were "Highland Jacobites who fled Scotland" after the Jacobite rising of 1745, but returned after the 1747 Act of Indemnity. Also according to Campbell, his maternal grandfather, James Dunnachie, was an acquaintance of poets Robert Browning and Alfred Tennyson and corresponded with Mark Twain.

In 1889, Campbell's parents moved to Natal, where his father established a successful medical practice. Dr Campbell often travelled long distances on foot to treat patients and, in an unprejudiced approach rare in colonial South Africa, would treat both black and white patients. He also was generous to patients who could not afford to pay. "Sam Joj", as he was called, was remembered kindly by the Zulu people of Natal.

=== Childhood ===
Roy Campbell was the third son of Samuel and Margaret Campbell, born in Durban, Colony of Natal, on 2 October 1901. At that time, Roy's father was on active service as a major with the Natal Volunteer Medical Corps in the Second Boer War and did not learn of the child's birth for several days. Campbell was named Ignatius Royston Dunnachie Campbell for an uncle and christened in a Presbyterian ceremony.

According to Campbell, his first memory was of his Zulu nurse maid, Catherine Mgadi, who wheeled him further than usual on their morning outing to a site overlooking the Indian Ocean. Mgadi told him that the Indian Ocean was "Lwandhla", the word for the sea in the Zulu language, which Campbell later described as his first word.

After the birth of his younger brother, Neil Campbell, Roy was increasingly left in the care of Mgadi and he would later cite her as an early influence. Campbell also played regularly with boys from among the Zulu people. According to biographer Joseph Pearce, Cambell was influenced by these different cultures and by colonialism.

Campbell later described the Zulu people as "highly intellectual" and highly-skilled conversationalists, claiming that conversation "is the only art they have". His daughter, Teresa Campbell, said he respected the Zulu people "tremendously" and attributed Roy's skill at social mixing to this childhood influence.

Cambell was also influenced by Scottish culture via his father's Scottish coachman Dooglie, who taught the Campbell sons the Great Highland bagpipes and Highland dancing.

=== Teenager and voyage to England ===
Educated at Durban High School, Campbell counted literature and the outdoor life among his first loves. He was an accomplished horseman, hunter, and fisherman. In 1916, as the First World War was raging in Europe, a 15-year-old Campbell ran away from home and enlisted in the South African Overseas Expeditionary Force. He used the assumed name of Roy McKenzie and claimed to be an 18-year-old from Southern Rhodesia. However, a suspicious officer telephoned the Campbell family's home. Roy's sister Ethel picked up the phone and confirmed that Roy was only 15. Ethel later wrote "This was the first that any of us knew of his having run away from school and joined up.

At the end of 1917 Campbell left school with a third degree matriculation pass, which was the lowest possible pass mark. He registered at Natal University College, intending to read English, physics, and botany. His heart was not in his studies, however. The war was still raging and Campbell intended to enlist as soon as he was old enough, and hoped to attend the Royal Military Academy Sandhurst.

Campbell left the Union of South Africa in December 1918 aboard the Inkonka, a 2,000-ton tramp steamer. Almost as soon as the ship lost sight of land, the third mate entered Roy's cabin and, objecting to the large number of books, threw all of them, as well as Roy's painting and drawing materials, out of the porthole and into the sea. "Campbell," according to Pearce, "looked on as his cherished volumes of Shakespeare, Milton, Keats, Dryden, Pope, and Marlowe," disappeared over the side. In the absence of his books, Campbell spent much of the voyage on the fo'c'sle, watching "all those strange and beautiful creatures that inhabit the majestic southern extremity of our continent." Pearce also maintains that "Campbell's love affair with the sea, thus far expressed only in poetically imagined theory, was consummated by the cascading waters off the Cape."

When the Inkonka docked at Las Palmas in the Canary Islands, Campbell went ashore with one of the ship's apprentices, who was a Roman Catholic. While inside Las Palmas Cathedral, Campbell was shown several holy relics, including the heart of Bishop Juan de Frías, "who sacrificed himself to the protection of the Guanches or natives of the Canaries." According to Pearce, "Campbell recalled that the heart was so magnified by the glass and the spirits in which it was kept that he laughed in a superior way and swore it was the heart of a rhino or hippo. His skepticism suggests an antagonism towards Catholicism, but was also indicative of a general disillusionment with Christianity. He had moved from a lukewarm and half-hearted acceptance of his parents' Presbyterianism towards an inarticulate agnosticism."

In February 1919, Campbell's ship steamed into the estuary of the River Thames during a particularly cold winter. Campbell later wrote, "It was certainly by far the widest river I had ever seen... Then warehouses and other phantasmal buildings loomed out of the mist on the distantly converging banks. Slowly, forests of masts and banks began to appear, and moving almost imperceptibly we berthed in the East India Docks cracking the first film of ice I had ever seen." After a brief tour of London on a donkey cart, Campbell took a train to Scotland to meet his maternal grandfather James Dunnachie, who gave his grandson £10, with which Campbell replaced the books he had lost at the beginning of the voyage.

According to his daughter Anna Campbell Lyle, Roy had grown up where "everything was beautiful, and like paradise," and then he came to "this funny little country full of fog, with no wild animals, very little sun and no mountains – he had a really mystical feeling about mountains... So he got a funny thing about England. I think he was terribly anti-Anglo-Saxon. He had a passion for Celts." Campbell later wrote in his memoir Broken Record, "My ancestors cleared out of Britain at the first whiff of the nineteenth and twentieth centuries, and I only came back to see what made them clear off in such a hurry, which I soon found out."

== From Oxford to Bohemia ==
=== Oxford ===
After a brief stay with his grandfather, Campbell travelled to Oxford University, where he hoped to pass the entrance exams to Merton College. During the spring of 1919, Oxford was filled with returning veterans of the Great War. Painfully shy, Campbell hid himself away in an attic room and read voraciously. He later wrote, "Never before, or since, have I done so much reading as I did at Oxford. Had I taken an ordinary course in English for three years, I would not have read a quarter as much."

While the Irish War of Independence was then taking place Campbell expressed support for Irish Republicanism in letters to his parents, despite his descent from Orangemen.

During this time, Campbell discovered the poetry of T. S. Eliot, which was then all the rage. He also attempted to write imitations of the poetry of both Eliot and Paul Verlaine. Campbell took as his subject "the gloomy railway stations he had seen on his recent journeys to and from Scotland." Campbell, however, was dissatisfied with the results and burned his manuscripts. He later said, "My early poems were so fragile and attenuated that Verlaine is robust in comparison."

While attending Greek tutorials, Campbell struck up a friendship with the future classical composer William Walton, who shared his enthusiasm for the poetry of Eliot and the Sitwells, and for the prose writings of Wyndham Lewis. Campbell later described Walton as "a real genius, and, at the same time, one of the finest fellows I ever met in my life." Even though Campbell preferred ragtime and the Border ballads to classical music, the two friends shared an intense hatred for learning Greek. Instead, they routinely neglected their studies "so they could enjoy endless nights on the town consuming large quantities of beer."

According to Pearce, "... claims in a biography of Campbell by Peter Alexander that Campbell had 'at least two short-lived homosexual affairs' at this time may well be unfounded. Although it is possible that Campbell went through a bisexual phase at Oxford, Alexander makes no effort to justify the claim and chooses not to name the two men alleged to have been the objects of Campbell's devotion. He merely cites Campbell's friend Robert Lyle as the source of the allegations. Lyle, however, states categorically, 'I know nothing of any homosexual attachments.' This being so, in the absence of any evidence to the contrary one should perhaps assume that Campbell's friendships at Oxford were platonic."

Despite his reading, Campbell failed the Oxford entrance examination. Reporting this to his father, Campbell took a philosophical stance, telling him that "university lectures interfere very much with my work", which was writing poetry. His verse writing was stimulated by avid readings of Nietzsche, Darwin, and the English Elizabethan and Romantic poets. Among his early fruitful contacts were C. S. Lewis, William Walton, the Sitwells, and Wyndham Lewis.

He also began to drink heavily, and continued to do so for the rest of his life.

=== London ===
Campbell left Oxford for London in 1920, where he immediately sank into what he later dubbed "that strange underworld ... known as Bohemia."

Nina Hamnett later recalled, "Roy Campbell was about seventeen and very beautiful indeed. He had the most wonderful grey eyes with long black eyelashes. He spoke with an odd gruff voice and a funny accent." Campbell gifted Hamnett a book of poems by Arthur Rimbaud and kept her amused by singing what she later termed "Kaffir Songs" in the Zulu language. In response, Hamnet's friend Marie Beerbohm gave Campbell the nickname "Zulu", which stuck fast.

== Cohabitation and marriage ==
=== Meeting and cohabitation ===
Mary Garman was then living in a flat near Regent Square with her sister Kathleen. The sisters regularly paid court to young artists and musicians and often hosted bohemian parties. Although Mary was already intimately involved with the Dutch composer Bernard van Dieren, Campbell caught her attention immediately when she first saw him. Mary later wrote, "My sister Kathleen ... and I were riding on the top of a bus in Tottenham Court Road ... When we saw Roy for the first time. He got off the bus when we did and made for the Eiffel Tower Restaurant in Charlotte Street. We were quite intrigued, he was so good-looking, so foreign, who could he be? Once inside the restaurant he went straight to a table where a golden-haired girl, Iris Tree, was sitting alone, evidently waiting for him."

When they formally met a few weeks later Roy found himself confronted with "the most beautiful woman I had ever seen."

The homeless Campbell was invited by Mary and Kathleen to move in with them. Their daughter, Teresa Campbell, would later write, "In their different ways they were trying to escape convention. As my mother was always saying when she was about eighty – 'Roy and I were the first Hippies' and she seemed very proud of the fact." In the evenings, the three would lie arm in arm next to the fire, and Campbell would read his poetry aloud and would entertain both women with stories of his adventures in Provence and in the South African bush. For a time, van Dieren continued to visit the Garman sisters' flat, but eventually he admitted defeat. Kathleen was the mistress and muse of the married American sculptor Jacob Epstein, who was "violently jealous" and certain that Campbell was sleeping with both sisters.

In the winter of 1921, just two months after they had met, Campbell accompanied Mary and Kathleen to their family's estate at Oakeswell Hall, near Wednesbury, Staffordshire, to spend Christmas with the Garman family. Upon their arrival, Kathleen Garman said to her father: "Father, this is Roy, who's going to marry Mary." Horrified, Dr. Garman cried, "My eldest daughter?! To a complete stranger?!" Campbell later admitted that he felt deeply uncomfortable during the visit and knew that the eyes of the Garman family were always watching him. At first, desperate for them to accept him, Campbell refused to drink wine during meals. In time, however, he was regularly escaping the anxiety of the visit by going on drunken binges at the local pub. In response, Dr. Garman tried to persuade his daughter to call off the wedding, saying that she was "marrying a dipsomaniac". Campbell's daughter Anna later wrote, "All their good sense was useless. My parents already considered themselves eternal partners."

=== Marriage ===
On 11 February 1922, Campbell and Mary Garman were married in the Church of England parish at Wednesbury, near her family's estate. As Campbell owned no formal suit, he had purchased one second-hand for 12 shillings. Mary, however, was horrified and demanded that Campbell change back into his usual clothing. Mary wore a long black dress with a golden veil, not to be eccentric but simply because she had nothing else. During the ceremony, when Campbell knelt before the altar, he exposed the holes in the soles of his shoes to the whole congregation. In response, Mary's former nanny was heard to lament, "Oh dear, I always thought Miss Mary would marry a gentleman with a park!"

Campbell later wrote, "My father heard of our marriage too late to stop it; he was naturally hurt that, being a minor, I had not consulted him about it, since he had always been so good to me and always sent me any money I asked for when I was hard up. My excuse was, and still is, that I was taking absolutely no risks at all of not getting married to this girl." Due to his decision to marry without paternal consent, Campbell forfeited, for a time, his generous parental allowance.

During a later conversation in Durban, Dr. Campbell said to his son George about Roy, "I suppose the silly little ass has married someone worthless." George responded, "No fear! He has married someone a thousand times too good for him! I would have done the same if I could."

Campbell would have two daughters with Mary: Anna and Teresa.

== Poet, satirist and critic ==
=== London to Wales ===
After their wedding, the Campbells moved into a rented flat above the Harlequin Restaurant. As Dr. Samuel Campbell had cut off his son's allowance, Roy and Mary made ends meet by pawning their wedding gifts. Campbell also earned some money as a literary critic.

At first, Campbell suffered from jealousy and once dangled Mary out of the window after she expressed an attraction to a female friend. Campbell later told an exaggerated version of the incident and said he had dangled Mary out the window to show her that "any marriage in which the wife wears the pants is an unseemly farce."

Meanwhile, Jacob Epstein was still convinced that Campbell was sexually involved with both Mary and her sister Kathleen. In order to gather proof of the orgies that he believed were taking place in the Campbells' flat, Epstein hired the Harlequin Restaurant's waiters to spy on them. When Campbell learned of Epstein's actions, he was outraged. One evening when Epstein and Kathleen Garman were dining together at the Harlequin, Campbell and Epstein engaged in a brawl on the floor above the restaurant. Both men stopped fighting at the shouts of Kathleen.

During a 1944 conversation inside the Eagle and Child pub in Oxford, Campbell told the story of the brawl to C. S. Lewis and J. R. R. Tolkien and claimed to have put Epstein in hospital for a week.

To escape the notoriety caused by the brawl, Roy and Mary Campbell moved from London to Ty Corn, a small converted stable three miles from the village of Aberdaron in Gwynedd, Wales. The Campbells stayed at Ty Corn for more than a year and lived off a diet of homegrown vegetables, sea-birds' eggs, and game birds that Roy poached with a small shotgun. These were supplemented by fish, lobsters and crabs purchased from Welsh fishermen. During the winter, Roy had to carry one hundred pounds of coal every week from the road, which was two miles away. Roy and Mary would read poetry aloud to each other by firelight. They were, as Campbell later wrote, living "under the continual intoxication of poetry".

During their stay in Ty Corn, the Campbells' first daughter, Teresa, was born, with the assistance of a Welsh midwife, on the night of 26 November 1922. Campbell later wrote, "I have not seen anything to equal the courage of my wife in fighting through this fearful night, when the wind blew the tiles off our roof and the rain and wind rushed in headlong." In later years, Teresa was fond of telling friends how she had been born in a Welsh stable and always added, "I weighed ten pounds, my mother nearly died having me, I was so big." According to Peter Alexander, "Campbell, unable to be present, sheltered behind a piece of corrugated iron on the beach, and suffered fearful sympathetic pain. At dawn, as the storm abated, he went out and shot a snipe, and grilled it on a spit for Mary's breakfast."

=== The Flaming Terrapin ===
Campbell completed his first long poem, The Flaming Terrapin, a humanistic allegory of the rejuvenation of man, at Ty Corn in early September 1922. After making several copies "in a beautiful, printed hand", Campbell mailed one to his Oxford friend Edgell Rickword. Rickword replied, "I have waited three days and three nights to be able to tell you quite coolly that the poem is magnificent. One doesn't often find anything to overwhelm one's expectations but this did completely... I know of no one living who could write in such a sustained and intense poetical manner... Lots of things might have weighed against my liking it (particularly your philosophy of sweat) but the sheer fecundity of images ravished my lady-like prejudices ... Good luck and ten thousand thanks for such a poem."

After also receiving a copy of The Flaming Terrapin, artist Augustus John showed it to T. E. Lawrence who wrote, "Normally rhetoric so bombastic would have sickened me. But what originality, what energy, what freshness and enthusiasm, and what a riot of glorious imagery and colour! Magnificent I call it!" Lawrence was so impressed by The Flying Terrapin that he mailed a postcard to the future publisher of his memoir Seven Pillars of Wisdom, Jonathan Cape urging Cape to "Get it – it's great stuff."

By mid-1923, the Campbells had moved back to London at the urging of Mary's mother, who felt that Ty Corn was no place to raise a child. In their flat at 90 Charlotte Street, Campbell received a letter from Cape, who was requesting to see The Flying Terrapin. Campbell hand delivered the manuscript the following day. When Cape read the poem, he decided to publish it. It was published in May 1924.

The Flaming Terrapin established Campbell's reputation as a rising star and he was favourably compared to T. S. Eliot's recently released poem The Waste Land. His verse was well received by Eliot himself, Dylan Thomas, Edith Sitwell and many others.

=== Voorslag affair ===
Returning to South Africa with Mary in 1925, Campbell started Voorslag, a literary magazine with the ambition to serve as a "whiplash" (the meaning of the title in Afrikaans) on South African colonial society, which he considered "bovine". Before the magazine was launched, Campbell invited William Plomer to help with it, and late in the year, Laurens van der Post was invited to become the magazine's Afrikaans editor. Voorslag was, according to Joseph Pearce, one of the first bilingual literary journals published in South Africa.

In what anti-apartheid South African author Jack Cope has termed "one of the most significant moral and intellectual revolts in the country's literary history", Campbell, as editor of Voorslag, accused his fellow White South Africans of racism and parasitism upon the black population, whom Campbell said deserved racial equality.

The first issue included a book review in which Campbell praised Plomer's recent novel Turbott Wolfe. The novel depicted a white artist filling his studio with black women as his models and sexual partners, much to the outrage of the artist's racist white neighbours. Plomer courted further controversy by ending his novel with an interracial marriage between a black man and a white woman. For these reasons, Plomer's Turbott Wolfe had been dubbed "A Nasty Book on a Nasty Subject", by the Natal Advertiser. In his review for Voorslag, Campbell praised Turbott Wolfe as "just and true", but also criticised Plomer for dehumanising the white racists in his novel. Campbell wrote:

Mr. Plomer has shown his white characters when acting under the influence of race-feeling, behaving with typical ferocity and injustice. But he fails to let them relax enough into their individual and comparative dignity. He keeps pointing at them all the time and nudging the reader. I have known many farmers who capable of the most callous and criminal behaviour to the blacks, were guilless sons of the soil, as innocent as sleeping babes, with devout souls and sky-blue eyes. Their cruelty and impulsiveness was not even remembered when they relapsed again into their individual rationality. This type is much more normal than the bloodthirsty type described by Mr. Plomer and it confronts one with a far more terrible enigma. If Mr. Plomer had realized this his satire would have been more devastatingly complete and he might have achieved a masterpiece.

Elsewhere in the same issue, Campbell "attacked Colonial South Africa with unrestrained venom". He wrote that the white man's racial superiority was "a superstition which was exploded by science ten years ago and by Christianity two thousand years before." As a nation, he wrote that South Africa lagged "three hundred years behind modern Europe and five hundred years behind modern art and science." Furthermore, he accused white South Africans of being little more than a nation of parasites. Campbell concluded:

We have no excuse for our parasitism on the native and the sooner we realize it the safer for our future. We are as a race without thinkers, without leaders, without even a physical aristocracy working on the land. The study of modern anthropology should be encouraged as it would give us a better sense of our position in the family tree of Homo sapiens – which is among the lower branches: it might even rouse us to assert ourselves in some less ignoble way than reclining blissfully in a grocer's paradise and feeding on the labour of the natives.

Both Voorslag articles outraged the white population of Natal. In response, the magazine's owner, Lewis Reynolds, informed Campbell that, in the future, his editorial control over Voorslag was going to be drastically limited. Campbell resigned in protest. Campbell found himself subjected to social ostracism by the whites of Durban and found that even members of his own family wanted nothing to do with him. Left destitute, Campbell asked his friend C. J. Sibbett, a wealthy Cape Town advertising executive, and asked for a gift of £50, so that he and his family could return to England. Campbell concluded, "None of my relations will look at me because of the opinions I have expressed in Voorslag." Sibbett immediately sent Campbell the money.

Before leaving South Africa with his family in 1927, Campbell reacted to his ostracism by writing the poem "The Making of a Poet":

In every herd there is some restive steer
Who leaps the cows and heads each hot stampede,
Till the old bulls unite in jealous fear
To hunt him from the pastures where they feed.

Lost in the night he hears the jungles crash
And desperately, lest his courage fail,
Across his hollow flanks with sounding lash
Scourges the heavy whipcord of his tail.

Far from the phalanxes of horns that ward
The sleeping herds he keeps the wolf at bay,
At nightfall by the slinking leopard spoored,
And goaded by the fly-swarm through the day.

Campbell also wrote "Tristan da Cunha", and The Wayzgoose. The Wayzgoose was a mock epic lampoon, inspired by Alexander Pope and John Dryden in heroic couplets, which skewered the racism and philistinism of colonial South Africa. The latter poem included belligerent attacks against those who Campbell felt had wronged him in the controversy over Voorslag. The Wayzgoose was published in book form in 1928.

In a 1956 letter to Harvey Brit, who had accused Campbell of being a Fascist, Campbell wrote: "I am an exile ... from my country because I stood up for fair play for the blacks – is that Fascism?"

== Poet and war correspondent in Europe between the wars ==
=== Bloomsbury and move to France ===
Having returned to England, Campbell began to move in literary circles. Roy and Mary Campbell were installed as guests on the estate of Harold Nicolson and Vita Sackville-West and became involved with the Bloomsbury Group. A distrait Campbell ultimately learned, however, that his wife was engaged in a lesbian relationship with Vita and intended to leave him. Vita, however, while willing to continue the affair, had no intention of having the committed and monogamous relationship sought by Mary Campbell.

Though initially on friendly terms with the Bloomsbury Group, a heartbroken Campbell remained at the Long Barn upon the Nicholson estate as his wife's affair continued. His literary reviews and essays began to display an increasingly hostile opinion of Bloomsbury, whose poets and writers Campbell increasingly considered sexually promiscuous, snobbish, and anti-Christian.

According to Roger Scruton, "Campbell began to see the three aspects of the new elite—sexual inversion, anti-patriotism, and progressive politics—as aspects of a single frame of mind. These three qualities amounted, for Campbell, to a refusal to grow up. The new elite, in Campbell's opinion, lived as bloodless parasites on their social inferiors and moral betters; they jettisoned real responsibilities in favor of utopian fantasies and flattered themselves that their precious sensibilities were signs of moral refinement, rather than the marks of a fastidious narcissism. The role of the poet is not to join their Peter Pan games but to look beneath such frolics for the source of spiritual renewal."

In a positive review of Evelyn Waugh's recent biography of Dante Gabriel Rossetti, Campbell also expressed harsh criticism of the vocal contempt for the Victorian era shown by Bloomsbury writer Lytton Strachey in Eminent Victorians, "When the next generation comes to reevaluate the standards of the present one, it is possible that they will react against us as violently as we have reacted against the Victorians. As we ridicule the Victorians for their prudishness and hypocrisy, so our children may come to regard our ostentatious of frankness as a rather feeble apology for our flabby sensuality, and ourselves as a generation of harmlessly undiscriminating old fogeys who were about as sheepish about our few virtues and enthusiasms as the Victorians were about their vices... In comparing our promiscuity and frankness with that of the eighteenth century they will not fail to notice the peculiar absence of zest or enjoyment in its pleasures, and the lack of intellectual or physical vitality, which distinguish the present generation."

Referring to the Bloomsbury Group as "intellectuals without intellect", Campbell penned a verse satire of them entitled The Georgiad (1931). According to Joseph Pearce:

As with so much of Campbell's satire, The Georgiad's invective is too vindictive. It is all too often spoiled by spite. This underlying weakness has obscured the more serious points its author sought to make. Embedded between the attacks on Bertrand Russell, Marie Stopes, Vita Sackville-West, Virginia Woolf and a host of other Bloomsbury's and Georgians are classically refined objections to the prevailing philosophy of scepticism, mounted like pearls of wisdom in the basest of metal. "Nor knew the Greeks, save in the laughing page, The philosophic emblem of our age." [...] The "damp philosophy" of the modern world, as espoused by the archetypical modern poet, was responsible for the prevailing pessimism and disillusionment of the post-war world. In preaching such a philosophy, which was "the fountain source of all his woes", the poet's "damp philosophy" left him "damp in spirit". Nihilism was self-negating. It was the philosophy of the self-inflicted wound. In the rejection of post-war pessimism and its nihilistic ramifications... Campbell was uniting himself with others, such as T.S. Eliot and Evelyn Waugh, who were similarly seeking glimmers of philosophical light amidst the prevailing gloom. In his case, as in theirs, the philosophical search would lead him to orthodox Christianity.

According to his daughter Anna Campbell Lyle, "What put the finishing touches to his malaise at Long Barn, was coming across Virginia Woolf, crawling about under the bushes. She raised to his a face so ravaged by madness that he fled to London and thence to Provence, like Tam o Shanter pursued by the witches."

After Mary's relationship with Vita crumbled, she joined him at Martigues, where the spouses reconciled in the early 1930s. Campbell's French period saw the publication of, among other writings, Adamastor (1930), Poems (1930), The Georgiad (1931), and the first version of his autobiography, Broken Record (1934). In 1932, the Campbells retained the poet Uys Krige, who would go on to become a major figure in Afrikaans literature, as tutor to Tess and Anna.

Campbell's productive poetry writing during this time was stimulated by his reading of world literature. Particularly major influences at this time were Jean-Toussaint Samat's French prose translations from the Hunkpapa Lakota poetry of Michawago, a son of Sitting Bull, whom Campbell later praised as, "a very fine poet". Another major source of inspiration was the Occitan language poetry of Frédéric Mistral.

During this time, he and his wife Mary were slowly being drawn to the Roman Catholic faith, a process that can be traced in a sonnet sequence entitled Mithraic Emblems (1936).

=== Move to Spain and return to Britain ===
By the end of 1932, the Pound Sterling had devalued and it had become clear that Krige and the Campbells could no longer afford to live in France. During a discussion with Krige in the spring of 1933, Mary Campbell, "who had read the memoirs of Saint Theresa of Avila when she was six and had a preconceived idea of everything Spanish", recommended moving to Spain.

In the autumn of 1933, a neighbour demanded compensation for a broken fence and Campbell felt unable to pay. Facing a suit, a debt, and the prospect of imprisonment, Campbell moved his family across the border into the Second Spanish Republic. They travelled by train to Barcelona, where they were joined a few days later by their children, Uys Krige, the children's French governess, their dog Sarah, and whatever luggage they could carry between them.

According to Anna Campbell Lyle, in 1933, the Barcelona pension where the Campbell family stayed was flooded with German Jews and other anti-Nazi political refugees, who held a traditional German Christmas celebration. At the same party, Uys Krige attended with a Catalan girlfriend and Anna Campbell Lyle danced a paso-doble on the table.

In a 1933 letter from Barcelona to his Provence friend Count "Freddy" de Fremenville, an enthusiastic Campbell wrote, "How immensely rich Spanish literature is! I am reading Gongora, an extraordinarily modern poet though he lived between 1561 and 1612. He gave rise to the word Gongorismo, meaning, as far as I can make out, an accentuation of all the characteristics that distinguish Baroque art. He reminds me of Mallarmé, but is far greater. And Quevedo, what a satirist! Did you know that Cervantes was also a poet? I always thought he was one of us. We all miss you. When we are settled in our own house you must come and stay with us. I know you hate to travel, but one should see Spain before one's death."

The family settled in Toledo. They were formally received into the Catholic Church in the small Spanish village of Altea in 1935. The English author Laurie Lee recounts meeting Campbell in the Toledo chapter of As I Walked Out One Midsummer Morning, the second volume of his autobiographical trilogy.

In the months leading up to the Spanish Civil War there was much anti-clerical feeling among Spanish socialists and communists. According to Pearce:

In March 1936 the anti-clerical contagion spreading across Spain reached the streets of Toledo, the ancient city in which the Campbells had made their home. Churches were burned in a series of violent riots in which priests and nuns were attacked. During these bloody disturbances, Roy and Mary Campbell sheltered in their house several of the Carmelite monks from the neighboring monastery. In the following weeks, the situation worsened. Portraits of Marx and Lenin were posted on every street corner, and horrific tales began to filter in from surrounding villages of priests being shot and wealthy men being butchered in front of their families. Toledo's beleaguered Christians braced themselves for the next wave of persecution, and the Campbells, in an atmosphere that must have seemed eerily reminiscent of early Christians in the Catacombs of Rome, were confirmed in a secret ceremony, before dawn, by Cardinal Goma, the elderly Archbishop of Toledo and Primate of Spain. In July 1936, the civil war erupted onto the streets of Toledo, heralded by the arrival in the city of Communist militiamen from Madrid. With no one to defend them, the priests, monks, and nuns fell prey to the hatred of their adversaries. The seventeen monks from the Carmelite monastery were rounded up, herded into the street and shot. Campbell discovered their murdered bodies, left lying where they fell. He also discovered the bodies of other priests lying in the narrow street where the priests had been murdered. Swarms of flies surrounded their bodies, and scrawled in their blood on the wall was written, "Thus strikes the CHEKA."

Campbell later immortalized the incident in his poem "The Carmelites of Toledo".

On 9 August 1936, the Campbells boarded HMS Maine, which was evacuating British subjects to Marseilles. Within weeks, they were back in England. After the atrocities he had witnessed, Campbell was deeply offended by the generally pro-Republican sympathies in Britain, where large numbers of young men were volunteering for the International Brigades and where only British Catholics raised a dissident voice. While staying with his openly Stalinist in-laws at Binstead, Campbell was contacted by Oswald Mosley, the leader of the British Union of Fascists. In the fall of 1936, Percy Wyndham Lewis arranged a meeting between Mosley and Campbell. Campbell later recalled of the meeting, "I not only refused Mosley's and Lewis's offer of a very high position and lucrative position in the Fascist party but explained that I was returning to the ranks to fight Red Fascism, the worst and most virulent variety, and that when the time came I was ready to fight Brown or Black Fascism and that I could (though badly disabled) knock both of their brains out there and then! I explained that I was only fighting as a Christian for the right to pray in my own churches, all of which (save 3) had been destroyed in Red Spain...I then asked for my coat and hat: Lewis has never forgiven it."

Soon after the meeting with Mosley, Campbell read Mein Kampf and said of Adolf Hitler, "Good gracious! This man won't do – he's a teetotalitarian vegetarian!"

=== War correspondent and support for the Nationalists ===
On 29 January 1937, the family set sail to Lisbon on the German vessel Niasa. In June 1937, Campbell left Portugal for Spain, going to Salamanca and then to Toledo, where he retrieved the personal papers of Saint John of the Cross from a hiding place in his former flat. Campbell then attempted to enlist in one of the Carlist militias, but was informed by Alfonso Merry del Val, the head of the Nationalist Press Service, that he could better serve as a war correspondent alongside Francisco Franco's armies. Travelling on a journalist's pass issued by Merry del Val, Campbell left Toledo on 30 June 1937 and was driven to Talavera, where he suffered a serious fall, twisting his left hip. The following day, the special car travelled southwards from the front, ending its lightning tour in Seville. This visit appears to have been Campbell's only front line experience of the war. However, that would not keep him from later suggesting that he had seen far more action than he had. He did not fight for the Nationalists during the Spanish conflict, despite later claims.

Campbell's glorification in both prose and verse of the Nationalist faction drew a poor reaction from influential literati throughout the Anglosphere, among whom the Spanish Civil War was widely seen as a conflict between democracy and Fascism, and Campbell's reputation has suffered considerably ever since. Campbell had been a strong opponent of Marxism for some time, and fighting against it was also a strong motivation. In the heroic couplets of his poem Flowering Rifle, Campbell mocked the combat deaths of Republican soldiers, praised the Nationalist faction for defending the Church, and accused Communists of committing far more heinous atrocities than any Fascist government. In a footnote attached to the poem, he declared, "More people have been imprisoned for Liberty, humiliated and tortured for Equality, and slaughtered for Fraternity in this century, than for any less hypocritical motives, during the Middle Ages." Scholar Judith Lütge Coullie believes that Campbell "was extremely naïve politically and thus did not grasp the implications of his support for the Party that defended the Catholic Church."

Roy Campbell's preference for serving in a Carlist unit, however, is very revealing. According to Scottish historian Roger Hutchinson, Carlism as an ideology has very close similarities with 18th-century Jacobitism. This would further have appealed to Roy Campbell, whose maternal ancestors had fought in the Jacobite Army during the Rising of 1745 and who had grown up listening to Jacobite ballads being sung by his Scottish-born mother.

The Campbells' vocal support of Franco and the Nationalist faction caused many left-wing poets, such as Stephen Spender, Louis MacNeice, and Hugh MacDiarmid, to label Campbell a Fascist. MacDiarmid, a Scottish nationalist and communist, wrote an angry response to Campbell's Flowering Rifle entitled The Battle Continues. The second stanza included the lines:

Franco has made no more horrible shambles
Than this poem of Campbell's
The foulest outrage his breed has to show
Since the massacre of Glencoe!

Campbell's acquaintance C. S. Lewis, who he had first met as an Oxford undergraduate, also attacked him in a poem titled "To the Author of Flowering Rifle". In the poem, Lewis denounced Campbell's "lack of charity" and called him a "loud fool" who had learnt the art of lying from the very Communists he so claimed to despise. Lewis further declared:

—Who cares
Which kind of shirt the murdering Party wears?

In September 1938, the Campbell family went to Italy, where they stayed until the end of the Spanish Civil War. After the publication of Flowering Rifle in February 1939, they became popular in the higher echelons of Roman society. They returned to Spain in April 1939. On 19 May, Roy and Mary Campbell travelled to Madrid for the Victory Parade of Franco's forces.

== During the Second World War ==
At the outbreak of the Second World War, Campbell returned to Britain intending to volunteer for military service. In a subsequent poem, he expressed his elation and pride during the voyage from Spain when he saw the Royal Navy aircraft carrier HMS Ark Royal being towed into Gibraltar for repairs following combat against the German battleships Scharnhorst and Gneisenau. He later wrote several similar poems in favour of the Allied cause.

During the Battle of Britain, Campbell served as an Air Raid Precautions warden in London. During the Blitz, he met and befriended Anglo-Welsh poet and fellow alcoholic Dylan Thomas, with whom he once ate a vase of daffodils in celebration of St. David's Day. Although Campbell was over draft age and in bad physical shape, he finally managed to be accepted into the British Army. He was recruited into the Intelligence Corps because of his knowledge of foreign languages and began training as a private with the Royal Welch Fusiliers on 1 April 1942. Having completed basic training, Campbell was transferred in July to the I.C. Depot near Winchester, where he was trained in motorcycles.

In February 1943, Campbell was promoted to sergeant and learned that he was being posted in the spring to British East Africa. On 5 May 1943, Campbell arrived at Nairobi and was attached to the King's African Rifles, serving in a camp two miles outside the city. After having worked as a military censor, he was transferred in June to the 12th Observation Unit of the commando force being trained for jungle warfare against the Imperial Japanese Army. However, any hope of combat was thwarted when Campbell in late July suffered a new injury to his damaged hip in a fall from a motorcycle while training near Mount Kilimanjaro. He was sent to hospital in Nairobi, where the doctors examined an X-ray of his hips and declared him unfit for active service.

In the aftermath, Campbell was employed, between September 1943 and April 1944, as a coast-watcher, looking out for enemy submarines on the Kenyan coast north of Mombasa. During this period, he made several sojourns in hospital due to attacks of malaria. According to Pearce, "During the long months of boredom on the Kenyan coast or in hospital in Mombasa, Campbell began to brood over his predicament. In particular, he began to resent the fact that, in spite of his efforts to fight against Hitler, he was still being branded a fascist for having supported Franco. He compared his own position as a volunteer in the armed services with the position of leading left-wing poets such as Louis MacNeice, Stephen Spender, W. H. Auden, and Cecil Day-Lewis, who had settled for 'soft jobs' at home or, in the case of Auden, had emigrated to the United States at the first hint of the coming war."

On 2 April 1944, Roy Campbell was medically discharged from the British Army owing to chronic osteoarthritis in his left hip. Due to an administrative error, he was sent by sea to South Africa aboard the Free Dutch hospital ships Oranje. Here he saw his family, "whom I hadn't seen for eighteen years", and pondered as he sailed from the harbour on the growth of Durban from a little village upon his family's first arrival in the 1850s into a large modern port city with multiple skyscrapers. Returning to Britain, after convalescing in a hospital in Stockport, Campbell rejoined his wife. Since their house in Campden Grove had been severely damaged in the Blitz, the Campbells lived for a time in Oxford with the Catholic writers Bernard and Barbara Wall.

On 5 October 1944, Campbell spent an evening with C. S. Lewis and J. R. R. Tolkien at Magdalen College, Oxford. In 1962, Lewis recalled that he detested what he dubbed "Campbell's particular blend of Catholicism and Fascism". Before they met Campbell, according to Tolkien, Lewis, "had taken a fair deal of port and was a little belligerent", and accordingly recited his poem "To the Author of Flowering Rifle" aloud, while Campbell laughed off the provocation.

Tolkien, who was then hard at work writing The Lord of the Rings, found their conversation with Campbell delightful. In a letter to his son Christopher, Tolkien compared Campbell to Trotter, a torture-crippled hobbit in his novel, who would be rewritten as Aragorn in later drafts. Tolkien described Campbell as follows, "Here is a scion of an Ulster prot. family resident in S. Africa, most of whom fought in both wars, who became a Catholic after sheltering the Carmelite fathers in Barcelona — in vain, they were caught & butchered, and R.C. nearly lost his life. But he got the Carmelite archives from the burning library and took them through the Red country. [...] However it is not possible to convey an impression of such a rare character, both a soldier and a poet, and a Christian convert. How unlike the Left – the 'corduroy panzers' who fled to America [...]"

According to Pearce, "Yet, however much Lewis had been 'shaken' by the meeting with Campbell and however much he loathed his politics, the three men parted amicably at the end of the evening. It was midnight when Tolkien and Campbell left Lewis's rooms at Magdalen College with all three agreeing to meet again in the future." In the aftermath, Campbell joined Tolkien and Lewis at several meetings of the Inklings at Lewis's flat and at The Eagle and Child pub, where Campbell's "poetry, political views, and religious perspectives caused quite a stir." According to Pearce, "At these gatherings, Campbell and Lewis would continue to cross swords, although it would be their differences on literature rather than religion or politics that would fire the debate. The gist of their differences is encapsulated in one of Lewis's poems, entitled simply, "To Roy Campbell", in which he criticises Campbell for his negative attitude towards Romanticism. Interestingly, however, Lewis's tone is far more friendly than in his violent lampoon To the Author of Flowering Rifle, suggesting that the two men had warmed to each other in subsequent meetings."

At the same time, T. S. Eliot contacted Campbell and expressed a desire to publish a new volume of his poetry for Faber and Faber. The two poets met regularly throughout 1945, discussing arrangements for a poetry collection which Campbell titled Talking Bronco, after Stephen Spender's hostile review of Flowering Rifle in the New Statesman. Campbell wrote "a violently polemical preface" and many verse satires in which he lashed out against left-wing poets MacNeice, Spender, Auden, Day-Lewis and MacDiarmid, whom he accused, among other things, of cowardice for refusing to "join up" during the war. Eliot dissuaded him from printing the preface. Campbell resisted Elliot's efforts to convince him to remove the multiple poems that attacked the left-wing poets that were "destined to cause great offense."

== Post-war life and career ==
Following the end of the Second World War, Campbell's poetry and literary translation began once again to attract an audience. While continuing to struggle with recurring bouts of the malaria he had contracted in British East Africa, Campbell closely befriended several disillusioned Republican veterans of Spanish Civil War, including Hamish Fraser, Hugh Oloff de Wet, and George Orwell.

On 11 April 1949, Campbell "continued his war of attrition against Spender" by attending a poetry reading by the latter, which was being hosted by the Poetry Society at Bayswater. When Spender stepped up to the podium, Campbell shouted that he wished to "protest on behalf of the Sergeant's Mess of the King's African Rifles." Campbell then stormed the stage and punched Spender in the face, which left the communist poet with a bloody nose. Campbell's friends and family immediately removed him from the premises. Spender was urged to call the police and press charges but refused, saying, "He is a great poet; he is a great poet. We must try to understand." He then insisted on finishing his poetry reading.

In a letter to the organizer of the event, Campbell wrote:

No doubt you will wonder at my reason for disturbing your session the other night. There was no other option left me by the speaker's own announcement that he was going to denounce me from every public platform as "a fascist, a coward, and a liar" – merely because I had called attention to his war record. As I volunteered when over-age and while my own country (S. Africa) was still neutral, to fight fascism which is merely another form of communism ... I could not allow myself to be called a coward by one who during the struggle against fascism had employed no other weapon to the adversary than his own knife and fork and his highly lucrative but innocuous pen – while I was on ranker's pay suffering malaria in the jungle.

Towards the end of 1949, Campbell began a friendship with poet Edith Sitwell. Their friendship began because of Campbell's decision to defend Sitwell in print following an attack against her poetry by Geoffrey Grigson during a radio broadcast. When a grateful Sitwell invited Campbell to meet her for lunch, Campbell arrived, knelt down, kissed her hand, and said, "Edith, my darling, you are a great lady! I will be your knight and fight your battles for you!" Sitwell was deeply touched and later credited her friendship with the Campbells for her own conversion to Catholicism.

Spender later broke with the Communist Party of Great Britain and presented Campbell with the 1952 Foyle Prize for his verse translations of St. John of the Cross.

On 7 December 1951, Campbell's new memoir Light on a Dark Horse, which his friend Dylan Thomas later dubbed "this often beautiful and always bee-loud autobiography", was published "to a mixed reception, scattered reviews, and disappointing sales." In his new autobiography, Campbell expressed his disgust for South Africa under Apartheid. In one passage, Campbell argued that treating the non-white majority as an underclass in their own country was not only immoral but destructive:

The present disqualification of the native from so many aids to his own betterment is exactly on a part with the natives' treatment of each other. We are behaving about a quarter as badly as the Zulus and Matabeles did to their fellow Bantu, and it will do us little more good than it did them... and we may end by ranking the majority of the population in violent opposition to the white minority, which happened in the mad revolution in Haiti, when the black Emperor, Jean Christope, out-Caesared Nero and Caligula in the name of Liberty and Equality. We must never forget that theoretical Bolshevism is the most attractive dream-bait that was ever invented. Though practical Bolshevism may be the most diabolical and cruel hook ever inserted into bait ... You can expect a rustic Zulu to be proof against the seductive blarney which completely seduced the 'knowing and sophisticated' intellectuals of England and Western Europe for so many years.

On 1 May 1952, Campbell dined with fellow Catholic convert and satirist Evelyn Waugh. In a subsequent letter to Nancy Mitford, Waugh called Campbell "a great beautiful simple sweet natured savage", and said that he felt "quite dizzy from his talking to me." A few days later, Campbell had lunch with fellow South Africans Laurens van der Post, Enslin du Plessis, Uys Krige, and Alan Paton. During the lunch, the five men composed and signed an open letter to the South African Government, in which they denounced the ruling National Party's plans to disenfranchise Coloured voters. The letter was subsequently published by several South African newspapers.

On 9 May 1952, the Campbells moved to Linhó, Sintra, on the Portuguese Riviera. In Portugal, Campbell completed his translations of the complete poems of Charles Baudelaire. In a foreword that appeared when his translations of Les Fleurs du mal was published by Pantheon Books in London, Campbell described his recent successful translations of Saint John of the Cross and explained, "I determined to translate a fellow sinner, who was hardly less a believer, even in his blasphemous and rebellious moments, than the Saint himself. I have been reading Baudelaire since I was fifteen, carried him in my haversack in two wars and loved him longer and more deeply than any other poet." Campbell further compared himself to Baudelaire, saying that they both shared, "similar sins, remorses, ostracisms, and poverty and the same desperate hope of reconciliation and pardon."

Campbell then spent the rest of 1952 translating Eça de Queirós' novel Cousin Basilio into English from the original Portuguese.

In October 1953, Campbell embarked aboard the MS Vulcania at Lisbon for a voyage to Halifax, Nova Scotia followed by a lecture tour of Canada and the United States. The tour had been suggested and organised by John Sutherland, a well-known Canadian poet, literary critic, and editor of the Montreal-based literary magazine Northern Review, whom Campbell had already been corresponding with for quite some time. Sutherland later felt that the tour was largely a success, though it did cause protests to be organised by members of the American and Canadian Communist Parties against Campbell's allegedly "Fascistic opinions".

=== South Africa ===
In December 1953, Campbell learned that the University of Natal wished to confer an honorary doctorate upon him. Overjoyed "at this belated recognition from his native land", Campbell began planning what would be his final visit to South Africa. When Campbell arrived in Durban on 18 March, he was greeted by his brother George, his former schoolmaster Cecil (Bill) Payn, and many other friends and acquaintances, who swept him off to a rowdy party. While staying with his elderly mother, Campbell wrote to his friend Rob Lyle, "I'm sitting on my mother's stoep overlooking Pietermaritzburg, Table Mountain, and the Valley of a Thousand Hills. From her back stoep you can see the Drakensburg range, Cobalt and indigo taking up the whole horizon with incredible rock formations ... like rampaging dragons and saw-toothed dinosaurs. Nearer, bright green and yellow, forests and crags, are the Kaarkloof and Inthloraan ranges."

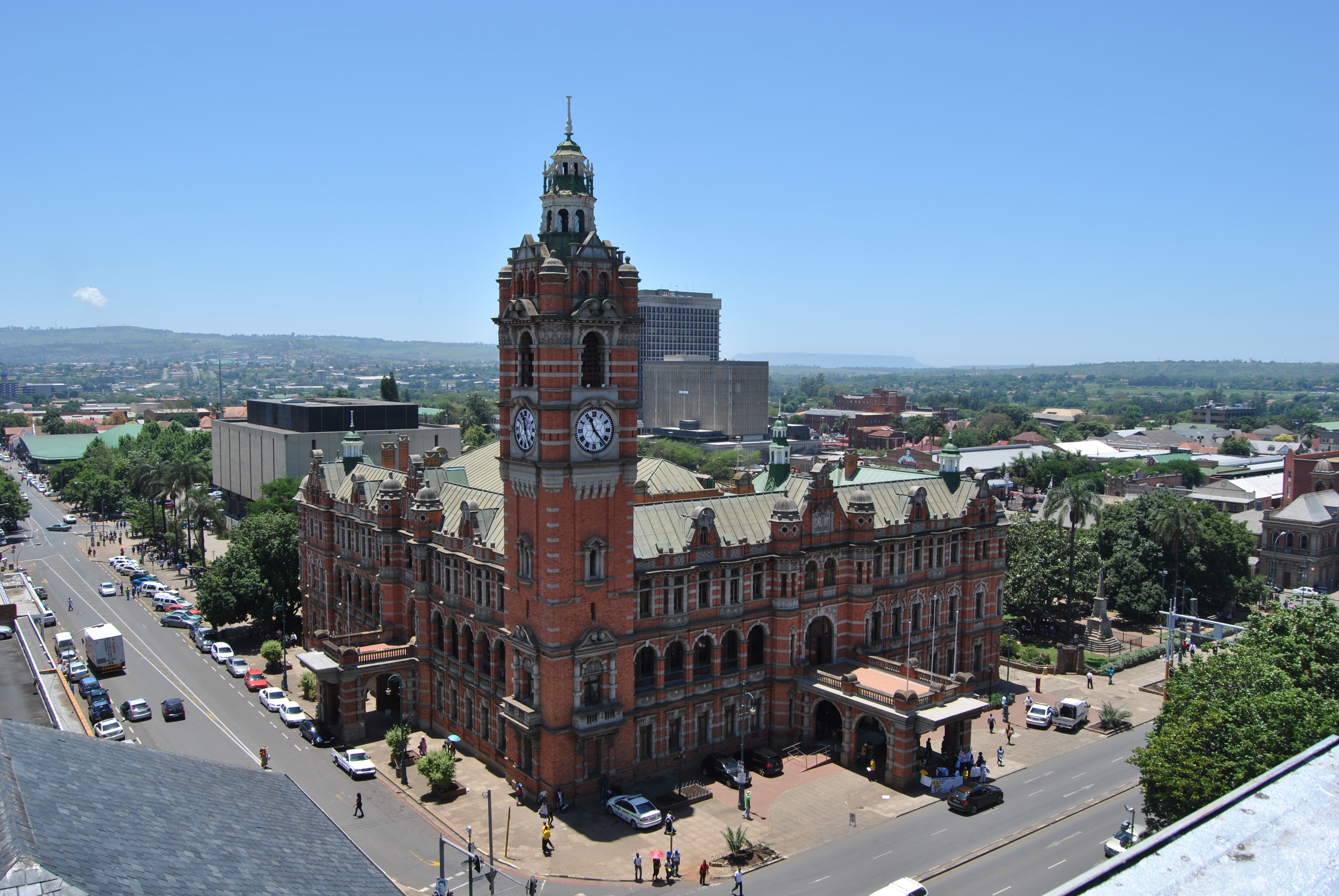
Pietermaritzburg City Hall

The honorary degree was awarded in a graduation ceremony at Pietermaritzburg City Hall on 20 March 1954. At the ceremony, Campbell abandoned his carefully prepared notes and instead of giving "the dignified discussion of poetry his audience expected, he trotted out all his political hobby-horses." Campbell shocked his primarily Anglo-African audience with a vigorous denunciation of both the United Kingdom and the British Empire. Though Campbell denounced South African Prime Minister D. F. Malan and the white supremacist National Party for what he called "the dangerous and suicidal plight of our country," Campbell's speech was interpreted by his hearers as a defense of apartheid. Campbell's audience also listened with mounting horror as he dubbed Winston Churchill "a valiant but superannuated Beefeater," and Franklin Delano Roosevelt "a tittering zombie", for having given Eastern Europe to Joseph Stalin during the Yalta Conference. Campbell also characteristically praised the anti-communist government of Spain under Franco.

In a letter written the following day to Rob Lyle, Campbell echoed the political opinions expressed in his speech, but also accused D. F. Malan and the National Party of Anti-Catholicism. Campbell also expressed a belief, however, that critics of apartheid were guilty of hypocrisy if they did not also condemn racial segregation and Jim Crow Laws in the American South, where he alleged the racist repression was much worse. In a letter to Edith Sitwell, Campbell once again dubbed Churchill a "valiant but stupid beefeater" and Roosevelt "a tittering zombie" but also "a criminal moron if ever there was one." Campbell also expressed anger that "Franco, the only man who ever fooled Stalin and Hitler has been called a puppet." According to Pearce, Campbell "also claimed, in an amazing example of selective and wishful thinking, that Spain, Portugal, and Ireland were all, 'run on papal encyclicals by kindly people.'"

In a letter from their farm in Portugal, Mary Campbell wrote, "All I know is that I have had enough of being quite alone here, and I am longing for you to come back." Campbell replied, "I am longing to see you my beloved – but this is the last time I will ever set eyes on my beloved country (how I love it!) so let me take in all I can before I finish with it." Before he left South Africa for the last time, Campbell spent a week fishing with his brother on the coast near Port Edward and attended his sister Ethel's funeral. During a trip to Hluhluwe game reserve, Campbell's attempt to secure a photograph of himself bullfighting a black rhinoceros with his duffelcoat ended disastrously. He also visited Portuguese Mozambique and Zululand taking photographs of the wildlife.

=== Final years and death ===
Campbell returned to his home in Portugal on 14 May 1954. He learned that his daughter Tess had been seeing a man named Ignatius Custodio and that, due to her pregnancy, a rushed wedding was being planned. Even though Custodio was "bitterly anti-clerical", he grudgingly agreed to Tess' insistence on having a Roman Catholic Nuptial Mass, which took place on 7 August 1954. Within two weeks, however, Custodio deserted Tess for another woman. After the birth of his grandson, Campbell wrote to Charles Ley in February 1955, "Tess's baby is doing fine. His name – Francisco. The father called him after Frank Sinatra: but we say we called him after the Caudillo."

During the summer of 1954, Campbell found himself again sick with malaria and spent much time in bed translating verse dramas from the Spanish Golden Age for the BBC. During the 1950s, Campbell was also a contributor to The European, a magazine published in France and edited by Diana Mosley. The European could also boast contributions from Ezra Pound and Henry Williamson.

After Campbell's conversion to Catholicism, he wrote spiritual verse. He also wrote travel guides and children's literature. He began translating poetry from languages such as Spanish, Portuguese, Latin, and French. Among the poets he translated were Spanish poet Francisco de Quevedo, the Portuguese poet Fernando Pessoa, the Brazilian poet Manuel Bandeira, the Ancient Roman poet Horace, and the Nicaraguan poet Rubén Darío. Campbell also produced translations into English of Federico García Lorca, a Spanish poet, outspoken Marxist, and homosexual, who was abducted and murdered by the Nationalists at the outbreak of the Spanish Civil War. In a self-deprecating poem titled "On the Martyrdom of F. Garcia Lorca", Campbell wrote:

Not only did he lose his life
By shots assassinated:
But with a hammer and a knife
Was after that—translated.

At the time of his death, Campbell was working on translations of 16th- and 17th-century Spanish plays. Although only the rough drafts were completed, Campbell's work was posthumously edited for publication by Eric Bentley under the title, Life Is a Dream and Other Spanish Classics.

Campbell died in a car accident near Setúbal, Portugal, on Easter Monday, 1957. The Campbells were returning home from attending Easter Sunday in Seville. According to his daughter Anna Campbell Lyle:

Mary was deeply religious and it was a great happiness to her to know that Father had died two days after receiving the Sacrament on Easter Sunday, so that he was in a State of Grace when his soul left his body. Father was buried in the cemetery of São Pedro in Sintra (the Cintra of Byron's Childe Harold) on the 26th. I often go there to take flowers to his tomb in which Mary now lies. This is not to be their last resting place. The South Africans want their greatest poet to be buried in what was, when all is said, the part of the planet he loved most."

According to South African Campbell scholar Judith Lütge Coullie, however, inquiries about efforts to repatriate Roy and Mary Campbell's remains to South Africa "have drawn a blank. It is unlikely, however, to be a priority in post-Apartheid South Africa."

== Literary style ==
Much of Campbell's verse was satirical and written in heroic couplets, a form otherwise rare in 20th-century English verse. Rhymed verse was generally his favoured medium. One modern assessment of his poetry is that "he was vigorous in all he wrote, but not distinctly original."

This is Campbell celebrating fertility and sexuality, in an extract from The Flaming Terrapin (1924):

Maternal Earth stirs redly from beneath
Her blue sea-blanket and her quilt of sky,
A giant Anadyomene from the sheath
And chrysalis of darkness; till we spy
Her vast barbaric haunches, furred with trees,
Stretched on the continents, and see her hair
Combed in a surf of fire along the breeze
To curl about the dim sierras, where
Faint snow-peaks catch the sun's far-swivelled beams:
And, tinder to his rays, the mountain-streams
Kindle, and volleying with a thunderstroke
Out of their roaring gullies, burst in smoke
To shred themselves as fine as women's hair,
And hoop gay rainbows on the sunlit air.

On the subject of nature, Campbell produced poetry such as this in his "The Zebras" (1930):

From the dark woods that breathe of fallen showers,
Harnessed with level rays in golden reins,
The zebras draw the dawn across the plains
Wading knee-deep among the scarlet flowers.
The sunlight, zithering their flanks with fire,
Flashes between the shadows as they pass
Barred with electric tremors through the grass
Like wind along the gold strings of a lyre.

Into the flushed air snorting rosy plumes
That smoulder round their feet in drifting fumes,
With dove-like voices call the distant fillies,
While round the herds the stallion wheels his flight,
Engine of beauty volted with delight,
To roll his mare among the trampled lilies.

Edith Sitwell wrote: "Roy Campbell was one of the very few great poets of our time. His poems are of great stature, and have a giant's strength and power of movement. They have, too, an extraordinary sensuous beauty. Everything is transformed to greatness."

== Legacy ==
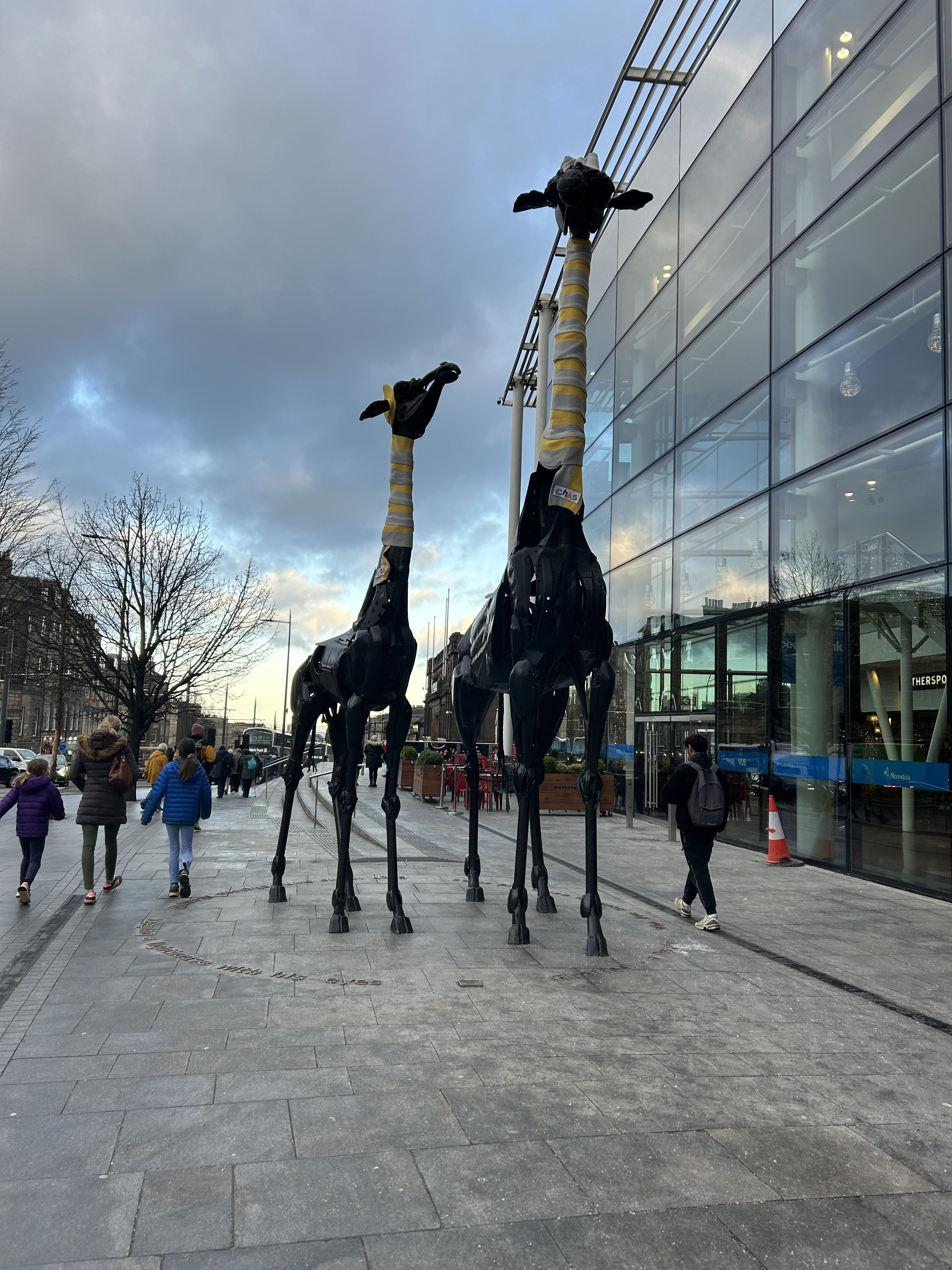
Dreaming Spires sculpture in Edinburgh of giraffes. Some lines of Roy Campbell's poetry can be seen underneath.

In a 2012 article for the Sunday Times, Tim Cartwright wrote, "Roy Campbell, in the opinion of most South African literary people, is still the best poet the country has ever produced." Cartwright added, "In later life, when Alan Paton set out to write Campbell's biography, it was Mary Campbell's absolute refusal to discuss [her affair with Vita Sackville-West] that led to Paton's abandoning the book. Paton, quite rightly, regarded this as the turning point in Campbell's life."

Meanwhile, Campbell's satirical poetry mocking the Marxism, Nihilism, narcissism, and promiscuity of the British intelligentsia caused him to be a very controversial figure throughout the English-speaking world during and long after his lifetime.

Furthermore, Campbell's similar attacks in both Voorslag and The Wayzgoose of what he saw as the racism, philistinism, and parasitism of White South Africans made Campbell an equally controversial figure in South Africa under apartheid.

In his 1982 book, The Adversary Within: Dissident Writers in Afrikaans, anti-apartheid South African author Jack Cope praised "the Voorslag Affair", as "one of the most significant moral and intellectual revolts in the country's literary history." Cope further praised Campbell, William Plomer, and Laurens van der Post, saying, "Their brief but glorious sortie helped to break up the smug and comfy little bushveld camp of colonial English writing which had been sending up its pipe fumes, coffee scents, and smoke screens for a century past."

Furthermore, through his friendship and mentorship of Afrikaner poet Uys Krige, Campbell's legacy also includes an enormous influence over the subsequent development of Afrikaans literature. Also according to Jack Cope, Krige's linguistic and literary talents, his passion for French, Spanish, Italian, and Portuguese literature, and having absorbed the literary translation philosophy of Campbell made Krige the greatest translator of poetry from Romance languages into Afrikaans during the 20th century. In addition to his acclaimed translations of both European and Latin American poetry, Krige also translated many of the works of William Shakespeare into Afrikaans from Elizabethan English.

Krige would also go on to become a literary and political mentor to the many young Afrikaans language poets and writers of the literary movement known as the Sestigers, which Louise Viljoen, in her biography of poet Ingrid Jonker, has described as nothing less than "a cultural revolt" against apartheid and the National Party from within "the heart of Afrikanerdom." Due in large part to Krige's influence, membership in the Afrikaner intelligentsia in South Africa under Apartheid became synonymous with opposition to the South African Government.

Elsewhere, however, although Campbell's translations of the French Symbolist poets Charles Baudelaire and Arthur Rimbaud have been reprinted in a few modern poetry anthologies, Campbell's support for Francisco Franco's Nationalists during the Spanish Civil War has caused him to continue being labelled as a Fascist and blacklisted from the vast majority of other poetry anthologies and university literature courses.

According to his daughters and his biographer Joseph Pearce, however, Campbell's opposition to the Second Spanish Republic was based on personal experience with both Republican war crimes and with the systematic religious persecution that targeted both the clergy and laity of the Catholic Church in Spain. Also according to Pearce, Campbell's verse satires, which his wife and daughters often begged him to stop writing, were modelled after the very similar poetry published in 17th- and 18th-century England by satirists John Dryden and Alexander Pope, who in turn had modelled their poems upon the satirical verse of Ancient Roman poets Gaius Lucilius, Catullus, Martial, and Juvenal.

Other scholars have also made efforts to restore Roy Campbell's reputation and his place in World Literature.

For example, in a 1968 lecture at Harvard University, Argentine writer Jorge Luis Borges praised Campbell's translations of the mystical Christian poetry of St. John of the Cross. Borges called Campbell "a great Scottish poet who is also South African", and cited Campbell's renderings of St. John's poetry as an example of how literary translation can produce superior works of poetry to the original poems in the original language.

Furthermore, Campbell may be credited with bringing the traditions of mock epics and satirical poetry in heroic couplets from the lifetimes of John Dryden and Alexander Pope into the 20th century and with updating both traditions accordingly. In this regard, Campbell continues to have followers, particularly in the literary movement within American poetry known as New Formalism.

In 1981, American poet and satirist R. S. Gwynn, a native of North Carolina, published one of the best known examples, The Narcissiad. Literary critic Robert McPhillips has dubbed Gwynn's The Narcissiad "a Popean mock epic lambasting contemporary poets".

Furthermore, the essays which comprise American Catholic literary critic and poet James Matthew Wilson's 2016 book The Fortunes of Poetry in an Age of Unmaking were inspired by Wilson's experiences while attending a convention of the Modern Language Association during the early 2000s. During the convention, a female scholar praised Anglo-Irish novelist Elizabeth Bowen for being an only child and used Bowen to attack "purveyors of hate," like Patrick J. Buchanan, who have praised having large families. Another scholar praised Irish playwright Samuel Beckett and used "the famous inaction and infertility," within Beckett's plays to denounce the Roman Catholic Church for discouraging disparity of cult marriages and for similarly encouraging large families. Wilson commented, "Much like the Bowen scholar before him, he seemed interested in his author primarily as a means of striking a blow against birth."

In response, Wilson writes that he was reminded of Roy Campbell's mockery of similar ideas among the British intelligentsia of the 1930s in the poem The Flowering Rifle. In the poem, Campbell vowed to "flaunt Truth:

Before the senile owl-roosts of our youth
Whom monkeys' glands seem powerless to restore,
As Birth Control was profitless before,
Which sponsored by their mockery of a Church,
Like stranded barbels, left them in the lurch,
Whose only impact on the world's affairs,
Has been to cause a boom in Rubber shares,
Who come to battle with both arms held up
And ask to be invited home to sup –
While back at home, to sound their battle-horn,
Some self-aborted pedants stray forlorn
And pity those who venture to be born."

== In popular culture ==
- The character of Zulu Blades in Wyndham Lewis' 1930 novel The Apes of God, is modeled after Campbell.
- Another fictionalized version of Campbell, under the name "Rob McPhail", appears in the 1932 novel Snooty Baronet by Wyndham Lewis. Campbell was reportedly happy to appear in the novel but was disappointed that his character was killed off by being gored to death while bullfighting.
- German aggrotech band C-Drone-Defect used Campbell's literary translation of Charles Baudelaire's poem Le Rebelle as the lyrics for the song "Rebellis" on their 2009 album Dystopia.

== Selected works ==
- The Flaming Terrapin (1924)
- Voorslag (1926–1927), a monthly magazine edited by Roy Campbell, et al.
- The Wayzgoose: A South African Satire (1928)
- Adamastor (1930)
- Poems (1930)
- The Gum Trees (1931)
- The Georgiad – A Satirical Fantasy in Verse (1931)
- Taurine Provence (1932)
- Pomegranates (1932)
- Flowering Reeds (1933)
- Broken Record (1934)
- Mithraic Emblems (1936)
- Flowering Rifle: A Poem from the Battlefield of Spain (1936)
- Sons of the Mistral (1938)
- Talking Bronco (1946)
- Poems of Baudelaire: A Translation of Les Fleurs du Mal (1946)
- Light on a Dark Horse: An Autobiography (1952)
- Lorca (1952)
- Cousin Bazilio by José Maria de Eça de Queiroz (Trans. 1953)
- The Mamba's Precipice (1953) (Children's story)
- Nativity (1954)
- The City and the Mountains by José Maria de Eça de Queiroz (Trans. 1955)
- Portugal (1957)
- Wyndham Lewis (1985)

== Sources ==
=== Books about Roy Campbell ===
- Poza-Latorre, Nuria (2024). La cruzada de los Campbell: En la encrucijada española. Spain: Independently published. ISBN 979-8344204383.
- Alexander, Peter (1982). Roy Campbell: A Critical Biography. Oxford: Oxford University Press. ISBN 0-19-211750-5.
- Campbell-Lyle and Campbell, Anna and Teresa (2011). Judith Lütge Coullie (ed.). Remembering Roy Campbell: The Memoirs of His Daughters Anna and Tess. Hamden, CT: Winged Lion Press. ISBN 978-1936294-04-6.
- Connolly, Cressida (2004). The Rare and the Beautiful: The Art, Loves, and Lives of the Garman Sisters. New York: ECCO. ISBN 0-06-621247-2.
- Coullie and Wade, Judith Lutge and Jean-Philippe Eds. (2004). Campbell in Context: CD. Durban, South Africa: Campbell Collections, University of KwaZulu-Natal. ISBN 1-86840-546-X.
- Lyle, Anna (1986). Poetic Justice: A Memoir of My Father, Roy Campbell. Francestown: Typographeum. ISBN 0-930126-17-3.
- Meihuizen, Nicholas (2007). Ordering Empire: The Poetry of Camões, Pringle and Campbell. Oxford: Peter Lang. ISBN 978-3-03911-023-0.
- Parsons, D. (1981). Roy Campbell: A Descriptive and Annotated Bibliography, With Notes on Unpublished Sources. New York: Garland Pub. ISBN 0-8240-9526-X.
- Pearce, Joseph (2001). Bloomsbury and Beyond: The Friends and Enemies of Roy Campbell. London: HarperCollins. ISBN 978-0-00-274092-0.
  - Published in the US as: Pearce, Joseph (2004). Unafraid of Virginia Woolf: The Friends and Enemies of Roy Campbell. Wilmington, DE: ISI Books. ISBN 1-932236-36-8.
- Povey, John (1977). Roy Campbell. Boston: Twayne Publishers. ISBN 0-8057-6277-9.
- Smith, Rowland (1972). Lyric and Polemic: The Literary Personality of Roy Campbell. Montreal: McGill-Queen's University Press. ISBN 0-7735-0121-5.
- Wright, David (1961). Roy Campbell. London: Longmans.
