= Garman sisters =

Members of the bohemian Bloomsbury set

The Garman sisters were members of the bohemian Bloomsbury set in London between the wars. The complex lives of Mary, Kathleen and Lorna included affairs with the writer Vita Sackville-West, the composer Ferruccio Busoni, the painter Bernard Meninsky, the sculptor Jacob Epstein (whom Kathleen married), the poet Laurie Lee and the painter Lucian Freud

== Biographies ==
=== Mary (1898–1979) ===
Mary Margaret Garman was the eldest of the sisters. Along with her sister Kathleen she ran away to London, where they lived in a one-room studio at 13 Regent Square on the edge of Bloomsbury. Mary was married to the penniless South African poet Roy Campbell from 1924 until he was killed in a car crash in Portugal in 1957.

=== Kathleen (1901–1979) ===
Kathleen Garman, the third sister, married Jacob Epstein in 1955. She had been his lover since 1921 and had three children by him. Epstein's jealous wife Margaret had shot and wounded Kathleen in 1923, and encouraged him into multiple affairs in the hope that he would tire of Kathleen and "return home". Six years after Margaret's death, Kathleen became Lady Epstein and, after his death, she was his sole beneficiary. She donated his works to the Israel Museum, and many can now be seen in the Garman Ryan Collection at the New Art Gallery in Walsall. Her daughter Kitty Garman married the painter Lucian Freud, who was a former lover of Lorna Garman, Kathleen's sister and Kitty's aunt.

=== Douglas (1903–1969) ===
Their brother Douglas Mavin Garman was born in Wednesbury, Staffordshire, and educated at Gonville and Caius College, Cambridge. Following graduation, he spent much of his time in London and Paris, alongside a brief sojourn in Leningrad in 1926. It was during this period that he assisted in editing The Calendar of Modern Letters, and contributed articles to it. Of left-wing sympathies, he worked during the 1930s for the Marxist publishers Lawrence and Wishart, and thereafter rose to become the Education Secretary of the British Communist Party, remaining in situ until 1950. He was also a member of the original Left Review circle. His first wife, Jean Sophie Hewitt, had an affair with his sister Mary and he became one of the lovers of the art collector Peggy Guggenheim.

=== Helen (born 1906) ===
Helen Francesca Garman, number six, married a Provençal fisherman called Polge. Her daughter Kathy (born 1931) married Laurie Lee, who was formerly engaged in an affair with the last Garman sister, Lorna.

=== Lorna (1911–2000) ===
Lorna Cecilia Garman married the publisher Ernest Wishart when she was 16 with whom she had a son, the painter Michael Wishart. Throughout the marriage she had affairs. The writer Laurie Lee fathered her third child, and during her affair with the painter Lucian Freud she modelled for many of his paintings and brought him objects, such as a dead heron and a zebra head, to be inserted in his pictures.

== See also ==
- List of Bloomsbury Group people
