= Pietermaritzburg City Hall =

- Pietermaritzburg-stadsaal
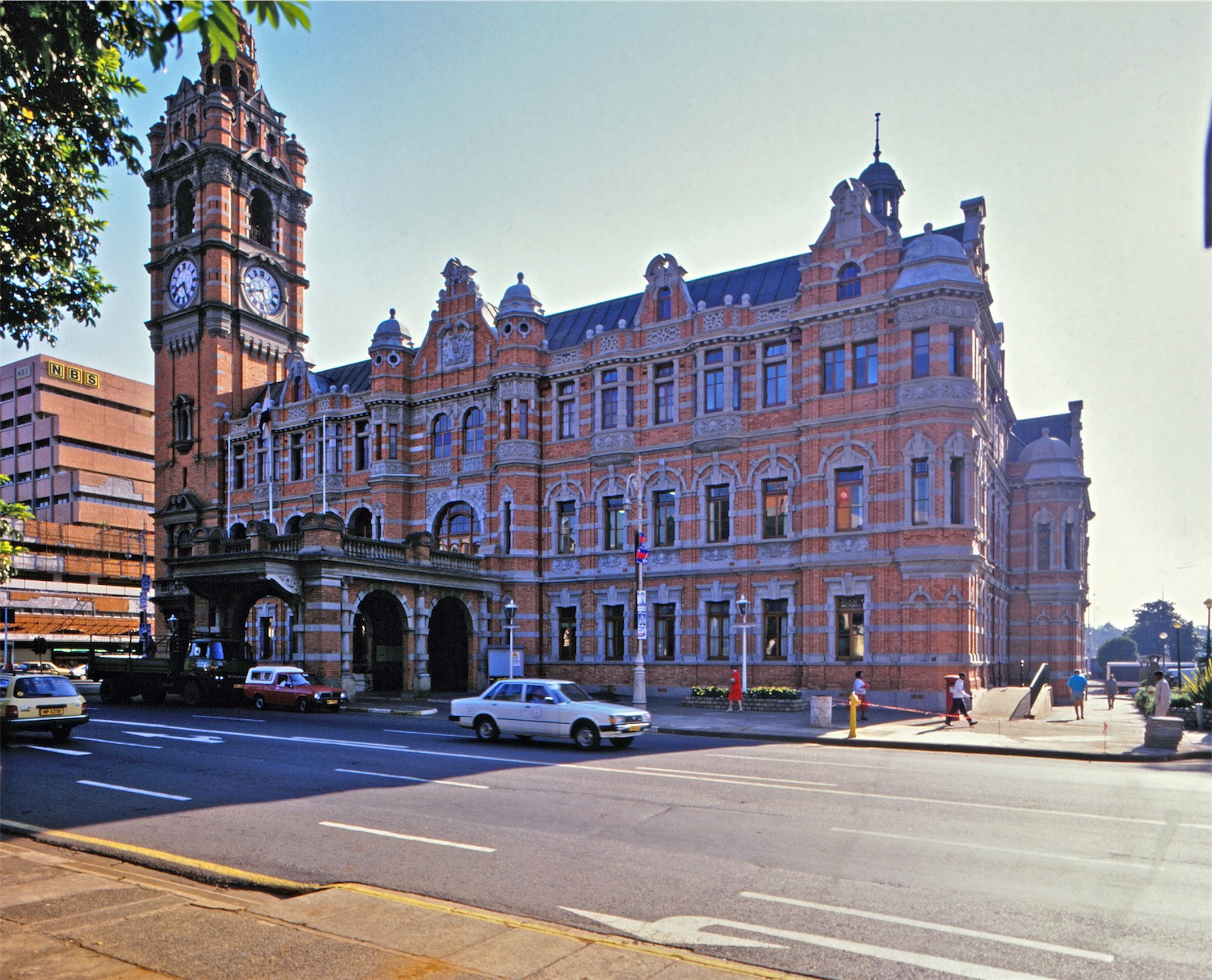
- Pietermaritzburg City Hall in 1988
- Click on the map for a fullscreen view

General information
- Architectural style: Flemish Renaissance Revival
- Location: Pietermaritzburg, South Africa
- Coordinates: 29°36′05.75″S 30°22′46.5″E

Pietermaritzburg City Hall (Afrikaans: Pietermaritzburg-stadsaal) is a historic city hall located at Pietermaritzburg in KwaZulu-Natal, South Africa.

== History ==
The building was erected between 1899 and 1901. It replaced a previous town hall, built in 1893 and subsequently destroyed by a fire in 1898. The new building was officially inaugurated in August 1901 by His Royal Highness the Duke of Cornwall.

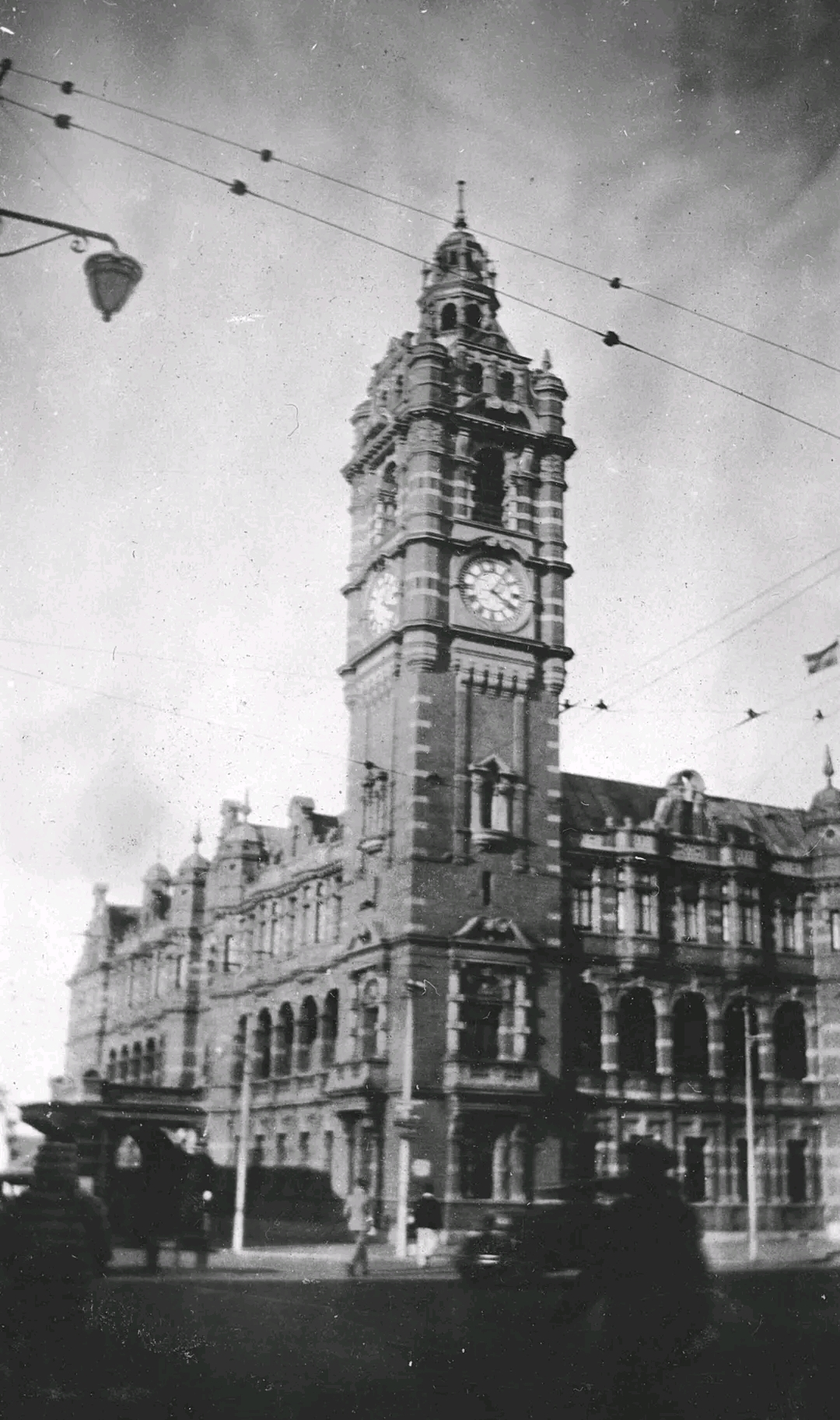
Pietermaritzburg City Hall found on a photo album dated 1924

== Description ==
The buildings features a Flemish Renaissance Revival style and red brick façades. It comprises a 47-metre-tall (154 ft) corner campanile.

== Gallery ==
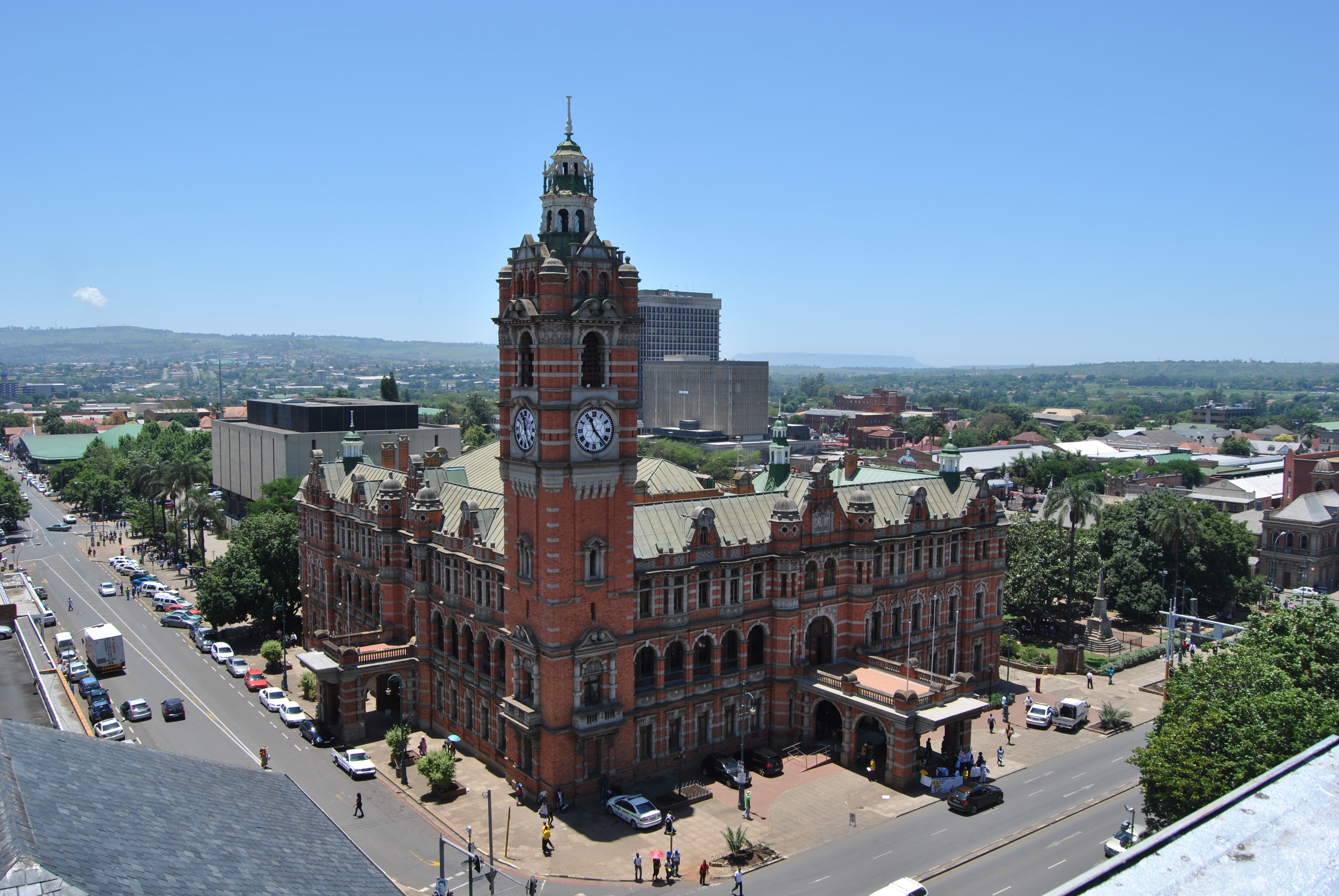

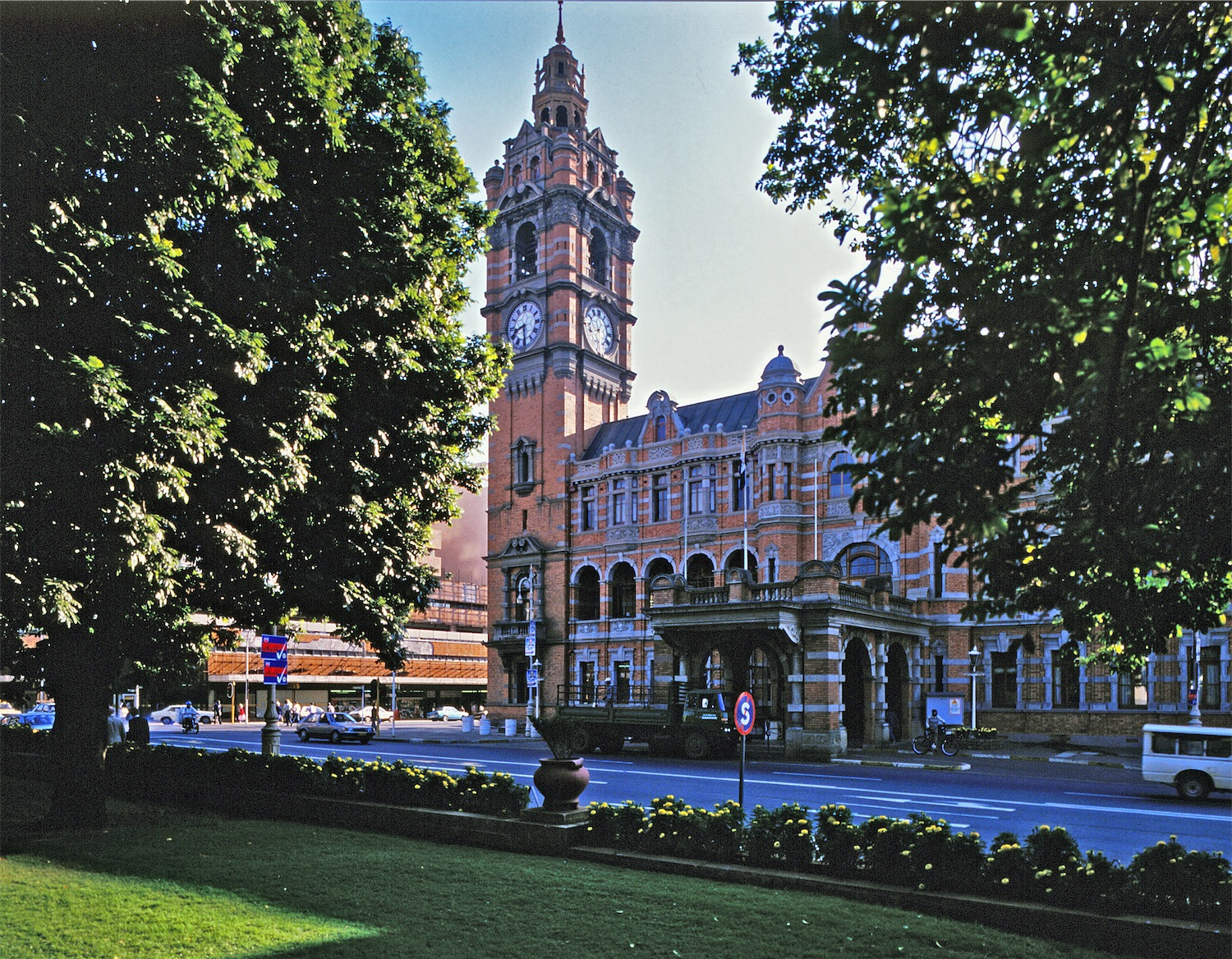

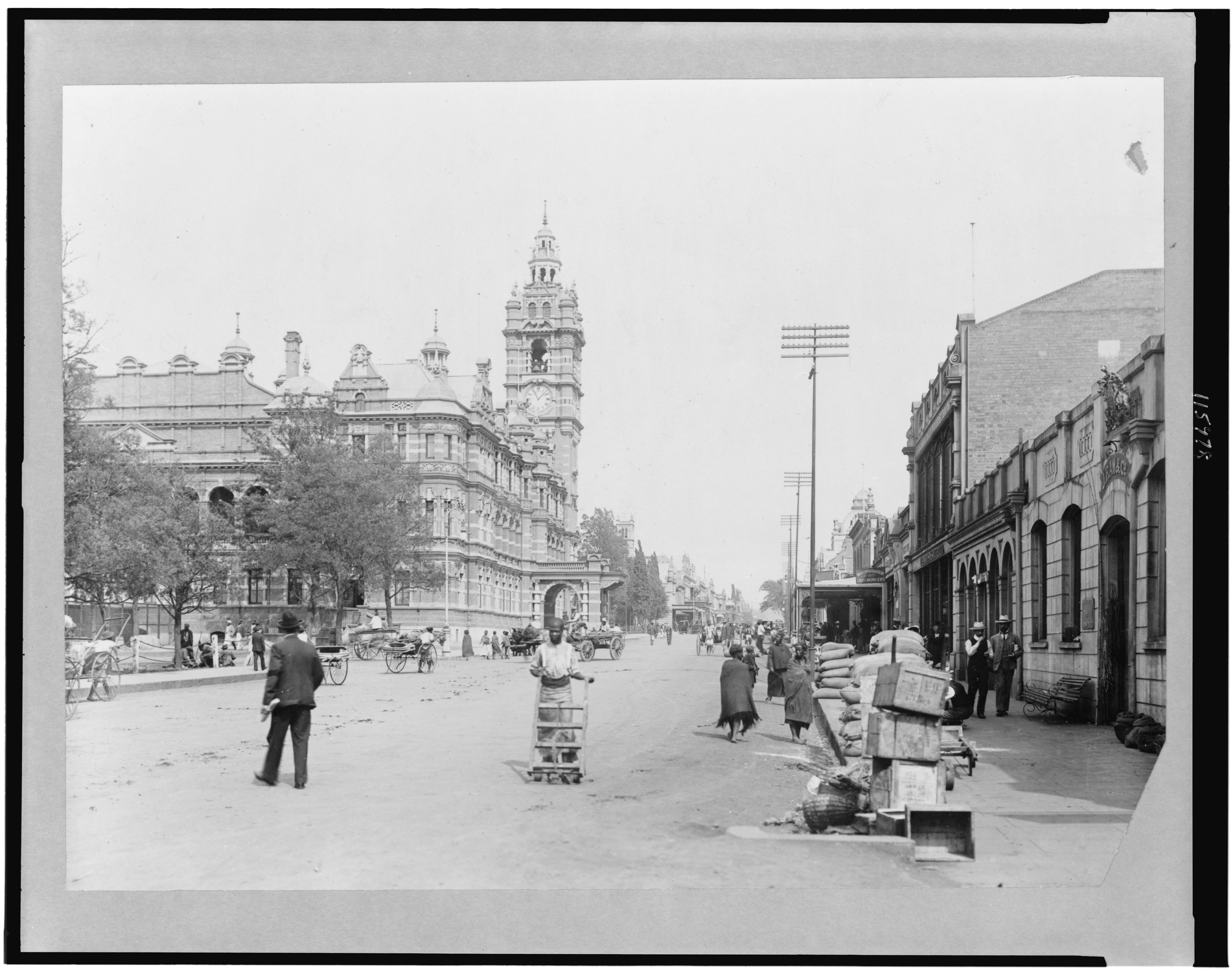

== See also ==
- List of heritage sites in Pietermaritzburg
