= Mary Garman =

British socialite (1898–1979)

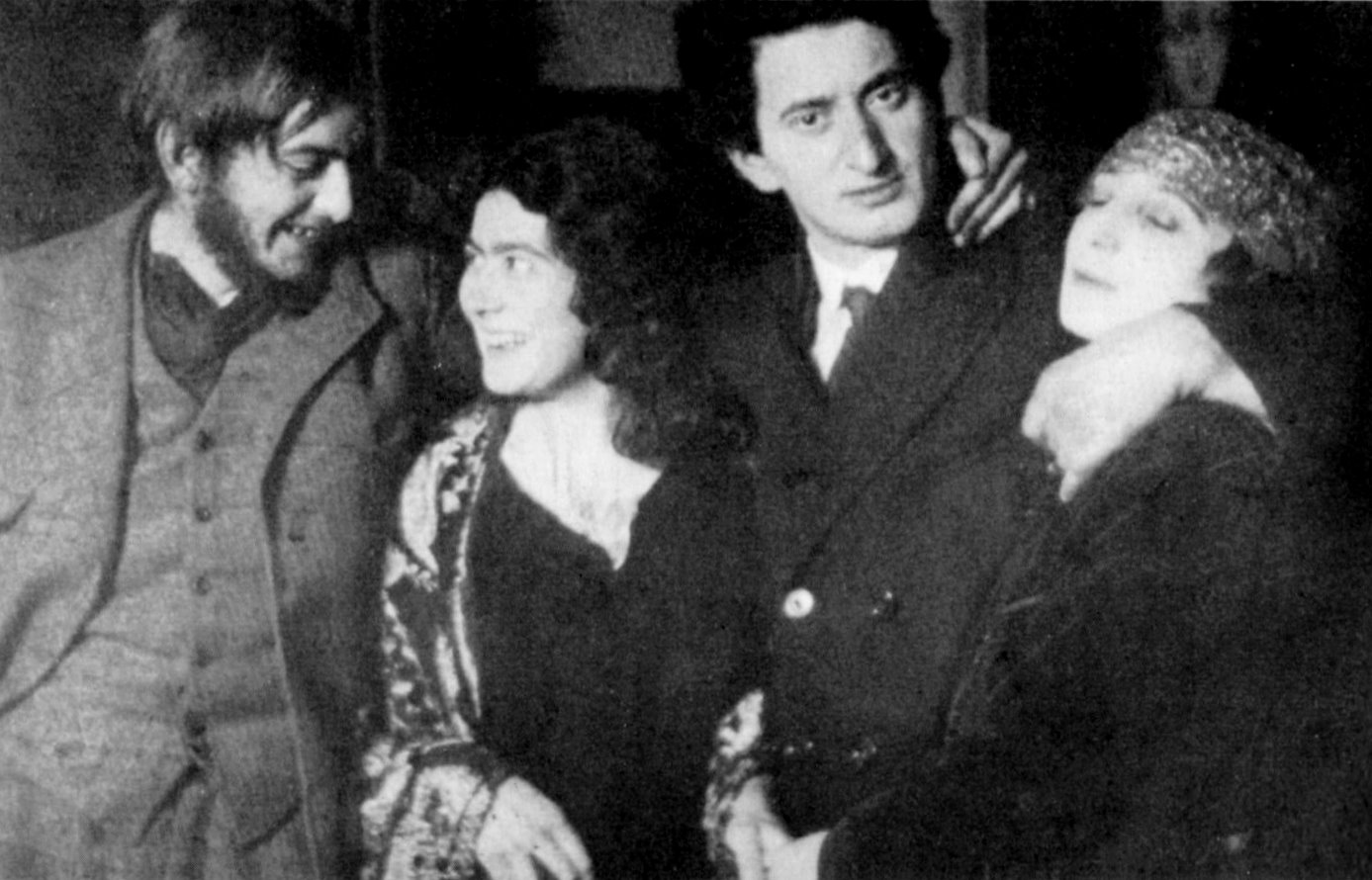
Roy and Mary Campbell (left), Jacob Kramer and Dolores (right), 1920s.

Mary Margaret Garman Campbell (1898–1979) was the eldest of the seven Garman sisters known for their glamorous, bohemian lifestyles and their many love affairs with famous artists, writers, and musicians of interwar London. She was a member of the Bloomsbury Group and the wife of the radical South African poet Roy Campbell, who attacked the group in The Georgiad (1931), a response to his wife's lesbian affair with Vita Sackville-West.

== Biography ==
Mary Margaret Garman was the eldest daughter of Walter Garman, a physician. She and her younger siblings grew up in the, "stately Elizabethan manor house," of Oakeswell Hall, Wednesbury, in the bleak surroundings of the Black Country.

Their childhood was a privileged one, "with the full retinue of governesses, nannies, parlor maids, and gardeners."

Mary, "had a devoutly Anglican upbringing", and in her early teens fell hopelessly in love with the local vicar.

But as she grew older, Mary rebelled against her parents by pilfering and selling household possessions for money to buy cigarettes, racy French novels, and tickets to the picture show. At the age of seventeen, Mary fell in madly love with the female art teacher at her boarding school, which Joseph Pearce has described as "the earliest indication of her latent bisexuality."

Her younger sister, Kathleen, called Kitty, was her main accomplice. The daring duo also drank at the local miners' pub. When Mary and Kitty were 21 and 17 years old, respectively, they ran away together and arrived in London penniless, where they set up house in a one-room studio at 13 Regent Square in Camden on the outskirts of Bloomsbury. They lived in self-imposed poverty, surviving on the little money they earned as artists' models.

The dazzlingly beautiful Garman sisters became prominent in London's artistic communities, including the bohemian Bloomsbury set. They frequented West End clubs such as the Gargoyle, the Harlequin and the Cave of the Golden Calf. Their circle of friends and acquaintances now numbered highbrows, Jews, poets, authors, painters, singers and ballerinas.

In 1924, Mary married the destitute South African poet Roy Campbell, wearing black and a gold veil. Their scandalous marriage lasted until his death in 1957. They shared an outrageous lifestyle epitomised by his suspending her from a balcony in a failed attempt to intimidate her into wifely submission. Campbell recorded his love for Mary in poems and memoirs, describing her ironically as a combination of Sappho and Saint Theresa. The infidelities of both parties included Mary's affair with Vita Sackville-West, which was commemorated in a series of sonnets by Vita and documented by Virginia Woolf, an ousted lover, in her biography of Sackville-West. Absorbed in their wild world, Roy and Mary Campbell were negligent parents, recalls their daughter Anna: "We were never told how to sit at a table ... or how important it was to change our knickers every so often."

In the 1930s, Mary and Roy Campbell moved to the south of France among Augustus John, Aldous Huxley, Sybille Bedford and Nancy Cunard, and later to Spain. She and her husband were received into the Roman Catholic Church.

She was driving the car when her husband was killed in a road accident in 1957. She died in 1979.

== See also ==
- List of Bloomsbury Group people

== Notes ==
=== Books about Mary Garman ===
- Poza-Latorre, Nuria (2024). La cruzada de los Campbell: En la encrucijada española. Spain: Independently published. ISBN 979-8344204383.
