= Harrison Garman =

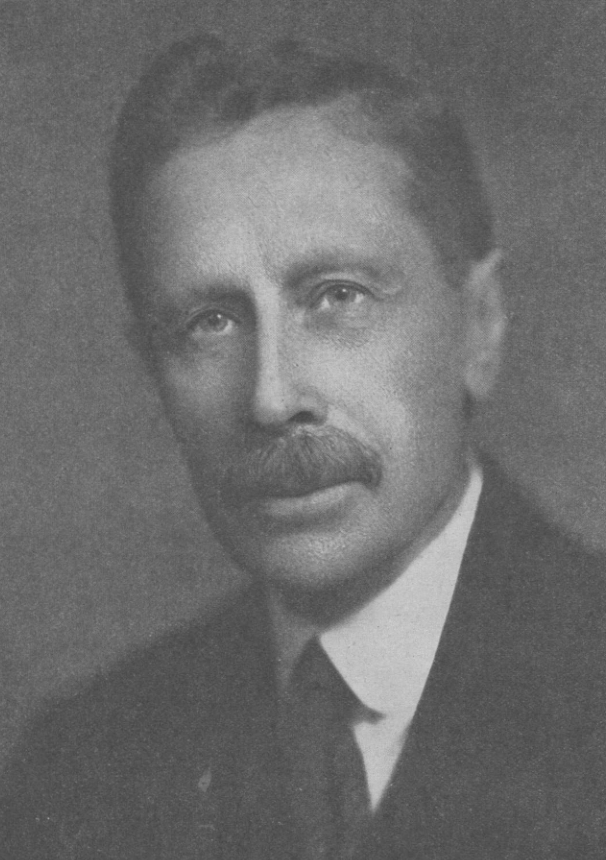
- In 1929
- Born: William Harrison Garman; December 27, 1856; Lena, Illinois, USA
- Died: August 7, 1944 (aged 87)
- Education: Johns Hopkins University
- Spouse: Rosalie Miller (m. 1883)
- Children: 2
- Scientific career
- Fields: Entomology; Zoology
- Workplaces: University of Kentucky

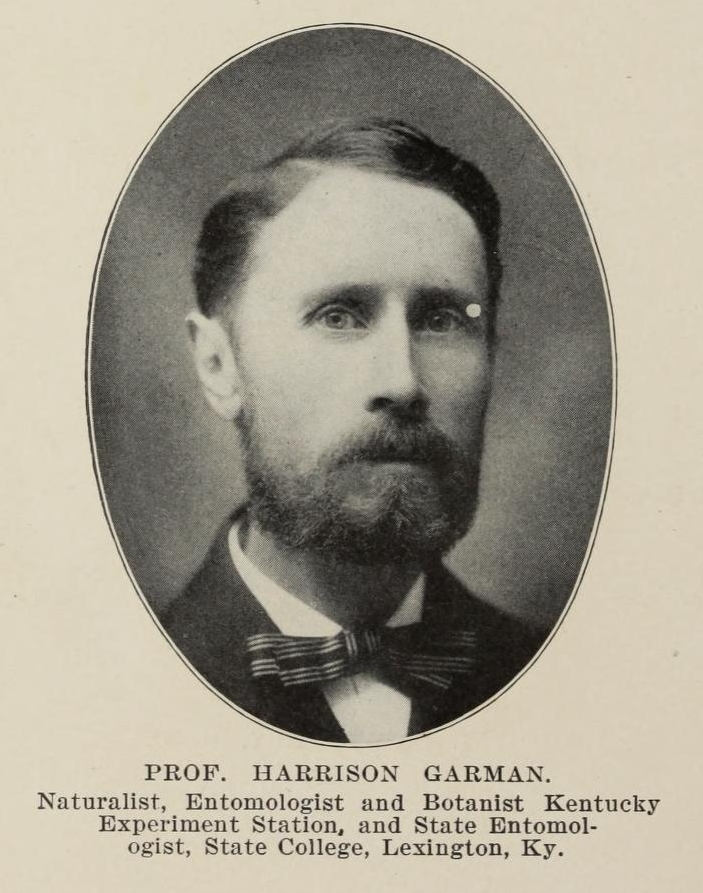
In 1902

Harrison Garman (27 December 1856 – 7 August 1944) was an American entomologist and zoologist. He helped establish the entomology program at the University of Kentucky where he served as a professor from 1912 to 1929.

== Life and work ==
William Harrison Garman was born in Lena, Illinois, to Benjamin and Sarah A. née Griffith. He grew up in the farmlands around Lena and when the family moved to Normal, he went to the school run by Thomas Metcalf. He met S. A. Forbes at the Illinois Natural History Survey and went to Johns Hopkins University where he studied under William Keith Brooks. He published his research on the development of a sea-urchin, Arbacia punctulata (1882). Around 1881 he dropped the "William" in his name. He then became an assistant to the state entomologist, S. A. Forbes, in 1883. He also taught at the university in Champaign. In 1889 he became head of entomology at the Kentucky Agricultural Experiment Station and became state entomologist in 1897. In 1912 he became professor of entomology and zoology. He also received a doctorate. Apart from insects, he also looked at fish, earthworms, birds and reptiles. He retired in 1929.

Garman married Rosalie Miller in 1883 and they had two sons.
