= Lorna Garman =

Member of the London Bloomsbury Set

- Born: Lorna Cecilia Garman; 11 January 1911
- Died: 12 January 2000 (aged 89)
- Known for: One of the Garman sisters; part of the Bloomsbury group

Lorna Cecilia Wishart, née Garman (11 January 1911 – 12 January 2000) was the youngest of the nine children of Walter Garman, an eccentric medical doctor, and his wife Margaret. Lorna, her six sisters and her two brothers grew up at Oakeswell Hall, Wednesbury, and then became prominent in the Bohemian Bloomsbury set in London between the two world wars. Lorna in particular had affairs with the poet Laurie Lee and the painter Lucian Freud. Her character may be summed up in this quotation from Cressida Connolly:

Lorna, the baby of the family, was perhaps the most flamboyant of the fabulous Garmans. She wore beautiful and unusual clothes, and smelled of Chanel No. 5, went riding on her horse at night, drove a chocolate-brown Bentley, and would strip naked to swim in inviting lakes or rivers or 10-metre waves. At 14 she seduced the man who would become her husband when she was 16, the publisher Ernest Wishart.

Ernest Wishart founded the publisher Wishart & Co., which soon became Lawrence and Wishart, which became the publishing house of the Communist Party of Great Britain, in collaboration with Lorna's brother Douglas Garman, the party's Education Secretary. Throughout her marriage to him Lorna had several affairs. With Wishart, she had 2 sons, Michael, who became a painter, and Luke. With Laurie Lee she had a daughter, Yasmin, in February 1939. She modelled for several pictures by Lucian Freud during her affair with him. She also brought him objects such as a dead heron and a zebra head for him to insert in his paintings. Both Lee and Freud went on to marry nieces of Lorna's, respectively Kathy Polge and Kitty Garman.

Lorna Wishart died on 12 January 2000.

== See also ==
- The Garman Sisters
- List of Bloomsbury Group people
