= Cider with Rosie (film) =

1998 British television film

- Genre: Biography; Drama; Romance
- Based on: Cider with Rosie by Laurie Lee
- Screenplay by: John Mortimer
- Directed by: Charles Beeson
- Starring: Juliet Stevenson
- Narrated by: Laurie Lee
- Music by: Geoffrey Burgon
- Country of origin: United Kingdom
- Original language: English

Production
- Executive producers: Rebecca Eaton; Jonathan Powell
- Producer: Adrian Bate
- Cinematography: Rex Maidment
- Editor: David Blackmore
- Running time: 100 minutes
- Production company: Carlton Television

Original release
- Network: ITV
- Release: 27 December 1998

Cider with Rosie is a British television film of 1998 directed by Charles Beeson, with a screenplay by John Mortimer, starring Juliet Stevenson, based on the 1959 book of the same name by Laurie Lee.

The film was made by Carlton Television for ITV and was first broadcast in Britain on 27 December 1998. It was broadcast in the US as the second episode of Series 28 of Masterpiece Theatre and was later issued as an ITV Studios DVD.

== Plot ==
The film is about the poet Laurie Lee's childhood and youth, between the ages of four and twenty-one, growing up in the Cotswold village of Slad, Gloucestershire, in the years following the First World War. It follows the ending of the traditional English village way of life, with the coming of motor cars and electricity, the death of the local squire, and the influence of the church ebbing away. As part of that breaking-down process, Lee's father abandons his family, leaving his wife to bring up eight children. One theme is Lee's awakening sexuality, as he grows older, and the title refers to his first flirtation, with a village girl called Rosie.

The main action of the film ends before Lee sets off on his early travels, which are dealt with in As I Walked Out One Midsummer Morning.

Videohound says of the film "Laurie's childhood consists of school, church, village festivals, eccentric relations and neighbors, and the usual childhood tribulations".

== Production ==
John Mortimer and Laurie Lee had been friends from the 1950s on. Soon after Lee's death in 1997, Mortimer spoke at a memorial service for Lee and then turned his friend's autobiographical book Cider with Rosie into a screenplay, persuading Carlton Television to produce it. Charles Beeson was appointed as director.

Lee's home village of Slad was found to have changed too much since the 1920s to be used as the main film location, with conservatories added to cottages and other modern alterations. In its place another village, Sapperton, near Cirencester, was used for filming most of the outdoor scenes, with the main street gravelled to overcome the out-of-character 1990s road surface. Several other Cotswold villages and the town of Stroud were also used as locations, as was Clevedon in Somerset, while Lee's final home in Slad, Rose Cottage, became the film location for the Slad village pub.

Juliet Stevenson was cast to play the pivotal character of Lee's mother, Annie, and she read the late Mrs Lee's letters in preparation for the role. Laurie Lee's own voice, recorded in 1988, was used for the narration, which gave the film extra impact, and the scriptwriter's daughter Emily Mortimer was cast as the mad Miss Flynn.

Casting director Pippa Hall gave a small boy, William Moseley, a walk-on part in the film, and seven years later she remembered him and cast him as Peter Pevensie in The Lion, the Witch, and the Wardrobe (2005).

== Reception ==
Country Life said in its review

This is not the first time that Lee's 1959 masterpiece, Cider With Rosie, has been adapted... Hugh Whitemore's 1971 script for the BBC was rendered into a beguiling, sunny fantasy under Claude Whatham's softly focused direction. The 1998 film, scheduled for December 27, takes a more realistic view of Cotswold rural life between 1918 and 1935. Indeed it is the most definitive screen version we are ever likely to get. John Mortimer's screenplay is faithfully crafted. The book is autobiography dressed and moulded through a poet's flighty imagination and lyrical prose, Charles Beeson's direction allows for this... There is a lot of fun and laughter in the Lee household, where 'our mother' is left to bring up eight children after her husband deserts, and there is a rich mixture of village eccentrics."

Valerie Grove, John Mortimer's biographer, later wrote of Emily Mortimer as "ethereally haunting as mad Miss Flynn, who drowns in the village pond."

== Cast ==
- Laurie Lee as Narrator, voice only
- Juliet Stevenson as Annie Lee
- Dashiell Reece as Laurie Lee (boy)
- Joe Roberts as Laurie Lee (teenager)
- Brad Simmons as Laurie Lee (older)
- Angela Pleasence as Crabby
- David Troughton as Uncle Sid
- Margery Withers as Granny Trill
- Freda Dowie as Granny Wallon
- Grant Masters as Father Lee
- Robert Lang as the Squire
- Emily Mortimer as Miss Flynn
- Hugh Lloyd as Joseph Brown
- Con O'Neill as Uncle Ray
- John Light as Harold
- Katharine Page as Hannah Brown
- Lia Barrow as Rosie Burdock
- Rupert Holliday-Evans as Deserter
- Amanda Boxer as Miss Biggs
- Clare Clifford as Spinster
- Stephen Critchlow as Fred Bates
- Elizabeth Kelly as Miss Pimbury
- William Moseley as Boy
- Ian Gargett as Jester

== Book ==
- Laurie Lee, Cider with Rosie (Penguin Books, 1959), ISBN 0-14-001682-1
- Laurie Lee, Edge of Day: Boyhood in the West of England, first US edition, 1960

== See also ==
- 1998 in British television
