= Ecocide =

Mass environmental destruction from human activities

Ecocide (from Ancient Greek oikos 'home' and Latin caedere 'to kill') is the destruction of the environment by humans. Ecocide threatens all populations. The Independent Expert Panel for the Legal Definition of Ecocide describes it as 'unlawful or wanton acts committed with knowledge that there is a substantial likelihood of severe and either widespread or long-term damage to the environment being caused by those acts'.

Common causes of ecocide include war, pollution, wanton overexploitation of natural resources and other industrial disasters. The term was popularised by Olof Palme when he accused the United States of ecocide at the 1972 UN Conference on the Human Environment due to the country's use of Agent Orange and other herbicides/defoliants during the Vietnam War.

The Rome Statute of the International Criminal Court (adopted 1998, enforced 2002) makes no provision for the crime of ecocide in peacetime, only in wartime. Ecocide in peacetime was to have been included in the Rome Statute, but was removed due to objections by the United Kingdom, France, and the United States. The disparity stemmed from the colonial powers' objections to inclusion of cultural genocide, during negotiations that had led to the creation of the Convention on the Prevention and Punishment of the Crime of Genocide (the CPPCG, or Genocide Convention, adopted 1948, enforced 1951).

Ecocide has been made national law in several countries, with many more countries and the European Union considering introduction of such a law. Stop Ecocide International and others are working to introduce ecocide in peacetime into the Rome Statute, making it both international and national law. Several countries – including Fiji, Niue, the Solomon Islands, Tuvalu, Tonga, and Vanuatu – have supported criminalizing ecocide under international law.

Ecocide is a common theme in fiction, with many films and books set in a post-ecocide world, including James Cameron's Avatar films, Blade Runner, Mad Max, WALL-E, Interstellar, Threads, and Soylent Green.

== Definition ==
The Independent Expert Panel for the Legal Definition of Ecocide, convened by the Stop Ecocide Foundation described ecocide in 2021 as 'unlawful or wanton acts committed with knowledge that there is a substantial likelihood of severe and either widespread or long-term damage to the environment being caused by those acts'.

Ecocide may occur with or without intent. Environmental lawyer Polly Higgins distinguished between ascertainable and non-ascertainable ecocide, with the former having a clear human cause while the latter does not. An example of non-ascertainable ecocide is destruction due to extreme weather events related to climate change.

Arthur H. Westing discussed the element of intent in relation to ecocide, stating that 'Intent may not only be impossible to establish without admission but, I believe, it is essentially irrelevant.'

== Causes ==
=== Genocide ===
Ecocide can threaten a people's cultural and physical existence, and several studies have shown that ecocide has genocidal dimensions. Destruction of the natural environment can result in cultural genocide by preventing people from following their traditional way of life. This is especially true for Indigenous people. Ecocide resulting from climate change and resource extraction may become a primary driver of genocide worldwide. Some Indigenous scholars have argued that ecocide and genocide are inextricable. Furthermore, in recent debates the connection between capitalism and ecocide has been subject to discussion. Scholars such as Crook, Short and South have argued that capitalist exploitation further exacerbates the impact of climate change and subsequently leads to further cases of ecocide. At times the relationship between landscape, capitalism and war has been viewed in more ambiguous manners. For example, in the case of the countryside of South Lebanon after the 2006 Lebanon War, Khayyat argues through the concept of 'resistant ecology'; that while war shapes landscape, landscapes adapt to its impacts to resist devastation through both human and non-human means.

Mainstream understanding of genocide (as defined by the United Nations) restricts genocide to acts committed against the bodies of individual people. Some genocide researchers argue that this human rights framework does a disservice to colonised Indigenous people who experienced social death with the loss of relationship to their land but who were not killed in the process of colonisation. An example of such an argument is found in Van Solinge's work on the exploitation of natural resources in parts of the African continent.

=== Climate change and mass extinction ===
The ongoing mass extinction of species has been called ecocide. US environmental theorist Patrick Hossay argues that modern industrial civilization is ecocidal.

Climate change may result in ecocide. For example, ocean acidification and warming causes damage to coral reefs, although ecocide of coral reefs has also been attributed to causes not related to climate change. Criminalization of ecocide under the Rome Statute has been proposed as a deterrent to corporations responsible for climate change, although others argue that criminalizing ecocide will not address the root causes of the climate crisis.

== Examples ==
Even though ecocide is recognised as a crime in a small number of countries, many examples of environmental destruction have been described as ecocide by academics, journalists, politicians and others.

=== Vietnam War ===
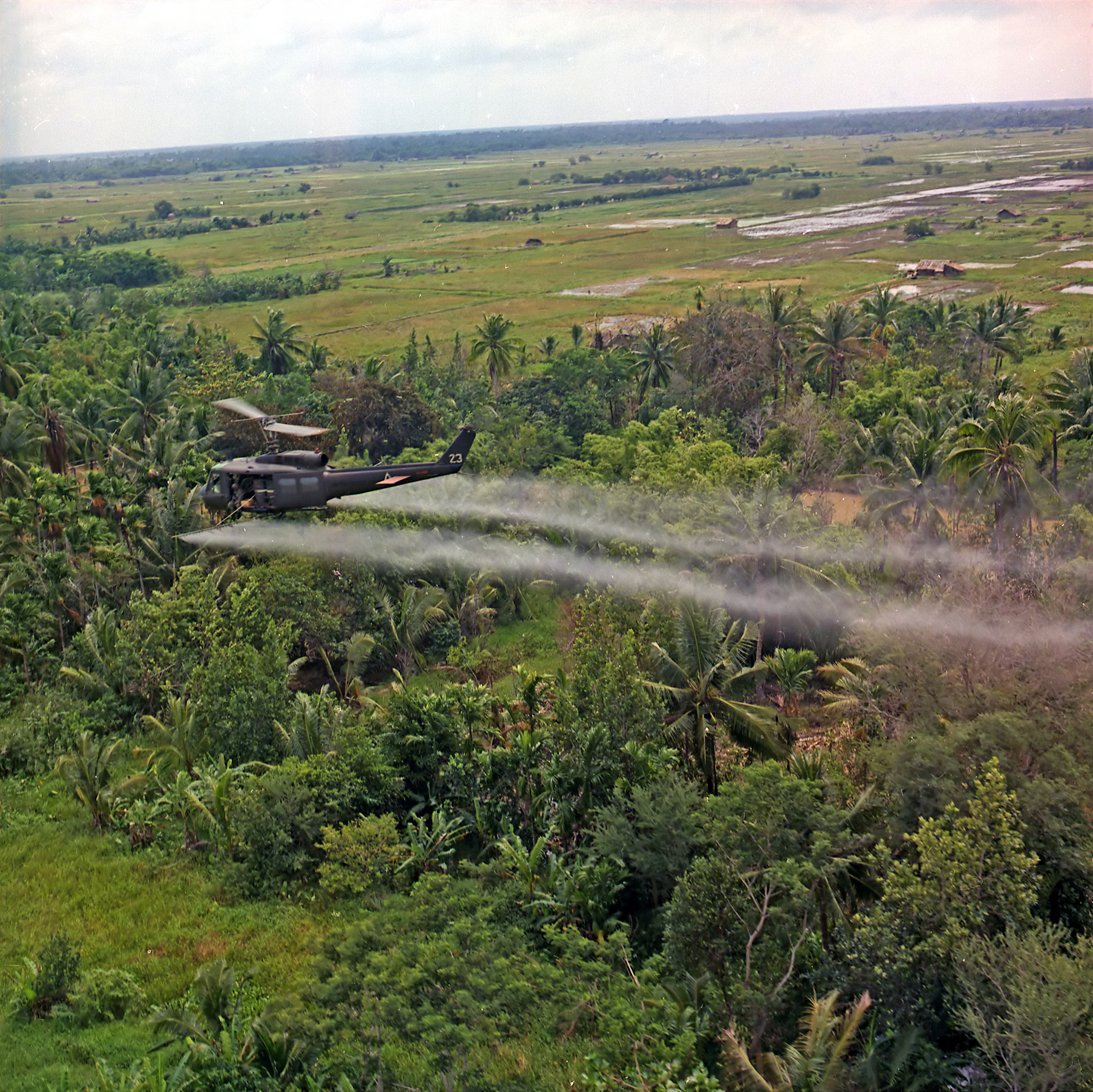
U.S. helicopter spraying chemical defoliants in the Mekong Delta, South Vietnam, 1969

One of the most controversial aspects of the U.S. military effort in Southeast Asia was the widespread use of chemical defoliants between 1961 and 1971. 20 million gallons of toxic herbicides (like Agent Orange) were sprayed on 6 million acres of forests and crops by the U.S. Air Force. They were used to defoliate large parts of the countryside to prevent the Viet Cong from being able to hide weaponry and encampments under the foliage, and to deprive them of food. Defoliation was also used to clear sensitive areas, including base perimeters and possible ambush sites along roads and canals. More than 20% of South Vietnam's forests and 3.2% of its cultivated land were sprayed at least once. 90% of herbicide use was directed at forest defoliation.

The chemicals used continue to change the landscape, cause diseases and birth defects, and poison the food chain. In combination with bombings and poaching by locals for their erroneously valued horns, Agent Orange led to the extinction of the Vietnamese Javan rhinoceros, reducing the population to 12 or less individuals in Cát Tiên National Park where the final individual of the subspecies was killed by a poacher in 2010. The aforementioned ecocides, bombings, poaching and wildlife trafficking fuelled by the war from locals also furthered the declines of several other native Vietnamese species such as the Indochinese tiger, Asian elephant, Edward's pheasant, northern white-cheeked gibbon, and saola. Official US military records have listed figures including the destruction of 20% of the jungles of South Vietnam and 20-36% (with other figures reporting 20-50%) of the mangrove forests. The environmental destruction caused by this defoliation has been described by Swedish Prime Minister Olof Palme, lawyers, historians and other academics as an ecocide.

=== Russian invasion of Ukraine ===
Before and after the destruction of the Kakhovka Dam

As of April 2025, the Russo-Ukrainian war caused an estimated UAH 4.0 trillion in environmental damages, equivalent to USD 99.8 billion during the first three years of the war. According to a report by the Yale School of the Environment, some 687,000 tons of petrochemicals have burned as a result of shelling, while nearly 1,600 tons of pollutants have leaked into bodies of water. Hazardous chemicals have contaminated around 70 acres of soil, and likely made agricultural activities temporarily impossible. Around 30% of Ukraine's land is now littered with explosives and more than 2.4 million hectares of forest have been damaged.

According to Netherlands-based peace organization PAX, Russia's 'deliberate targeting of industrial and energy infrastructure' has caused 'severe' pollution, and the use of explosive weapons has left 'millions of tonnes' of contaminated debris in cities and towns. In early June 2023, the Kakhovka Dam, under Russian occupation, was damaged – causing flooding and triggering warnings of an 'ecological disaster.'

The Ukrainian government, international observers and journalists have described the damage as ecocide. The Ukrainian government is investigating more than 200 war crimes against the environment and 15 incidents of ecocide (a crime in Ukraine, since 2001). Volodymyr Zelenskyy and Ukraine's prosecutor general Andriy Kostin have met with prominent European figures (Margot Wallstrom, Heidi Hautala, Mary Robinson and Greta Thunberg) to discuss the environmental damage and how to prosecute it.

=== Deforestation in Indonesia ===
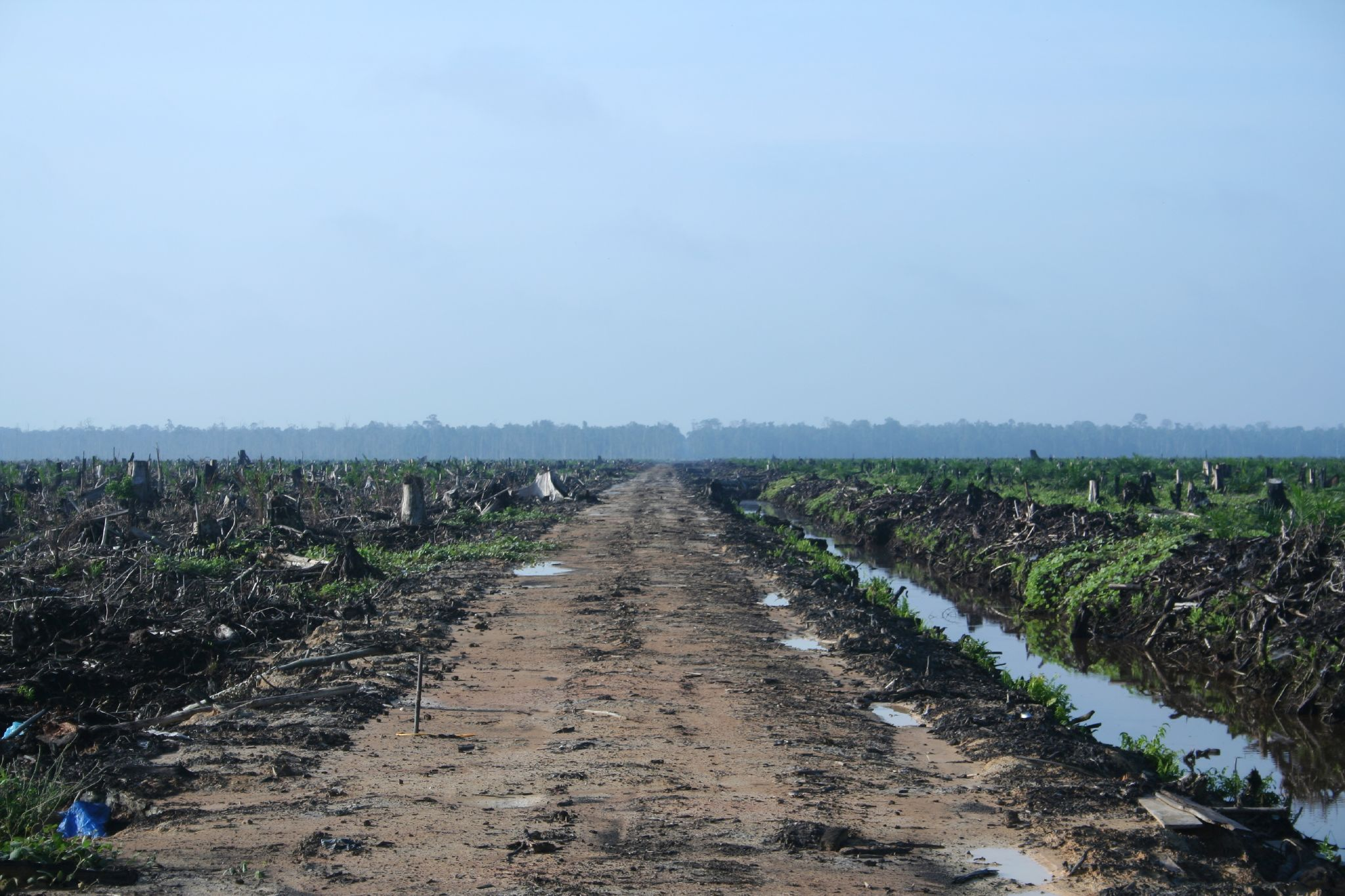
Deforestation in Riau province to make way for an oil palm plantation (2007)

Indonesia has one of the world's fastest deforestation rates. In 2020, forests covered approximately 49.1% of the country's land area, down from 87% in 1950. Since the 1970s, log production, various plantations and agriculture have been responsible for much of the deforestation in Indonesia. Most recently, it has been driven by the palm oil industry, which has been criticised for its environmental impact and displacement of local communities.

The widespread deforestation (and other environmental destruction) in Indonesia is often described by academics as an ecocide. The situation has made Indonesia the world's largest forest-based emitter of greenhouse gases. It also threatens the survival of indigenous and endemic species. The International Union for Conservation of Nature (IUCN) identified 140 species of mammals as threatened and 15 as critically endangered, including the Bali myna, Sumatran orangutan and Javan rhinoceros.

=== Chernobyl disaster ===
After the disaster, four square kilometres (1.5 sq mi) of pine forest directly downwind of the reactor turned reddish-brown and died, earning the name of the 'Red Forest'. Some animals in the worst-hit areas also died or stopped reproducing. The disaster has been described by lawyers, academics and journalists as an example of ecocide.

=== Niger Delta oil pollution ===
The effects of oil exploration in the fragile region of Niger Delta communities and environment have been vast. Local indigenous people have seen little improvement in their standard of living while suffering serious damage to their natural environment. Some of the hazardous damage of oil and gas exploration in the ecosystem are life-threatening which includes air pollution, water pollution, noise pollution etc. Affecting the aquatic lives, human health, also leads to deforestation. According to Nigerian federal government figures, there were more than 7,000 oil spills between 1970 and 2000.

It has been estimated that a clean-up of the region, including full restoration of swamps, creeks, fishing grounds and mangroves, could take 25 years. The Niger Delta is one of the most polluted regions in the world. The heavy contamination of the air, ground and water with toxic pollutants is often used as an example of ecocide.

=== Amazon rainforest deforestation ===
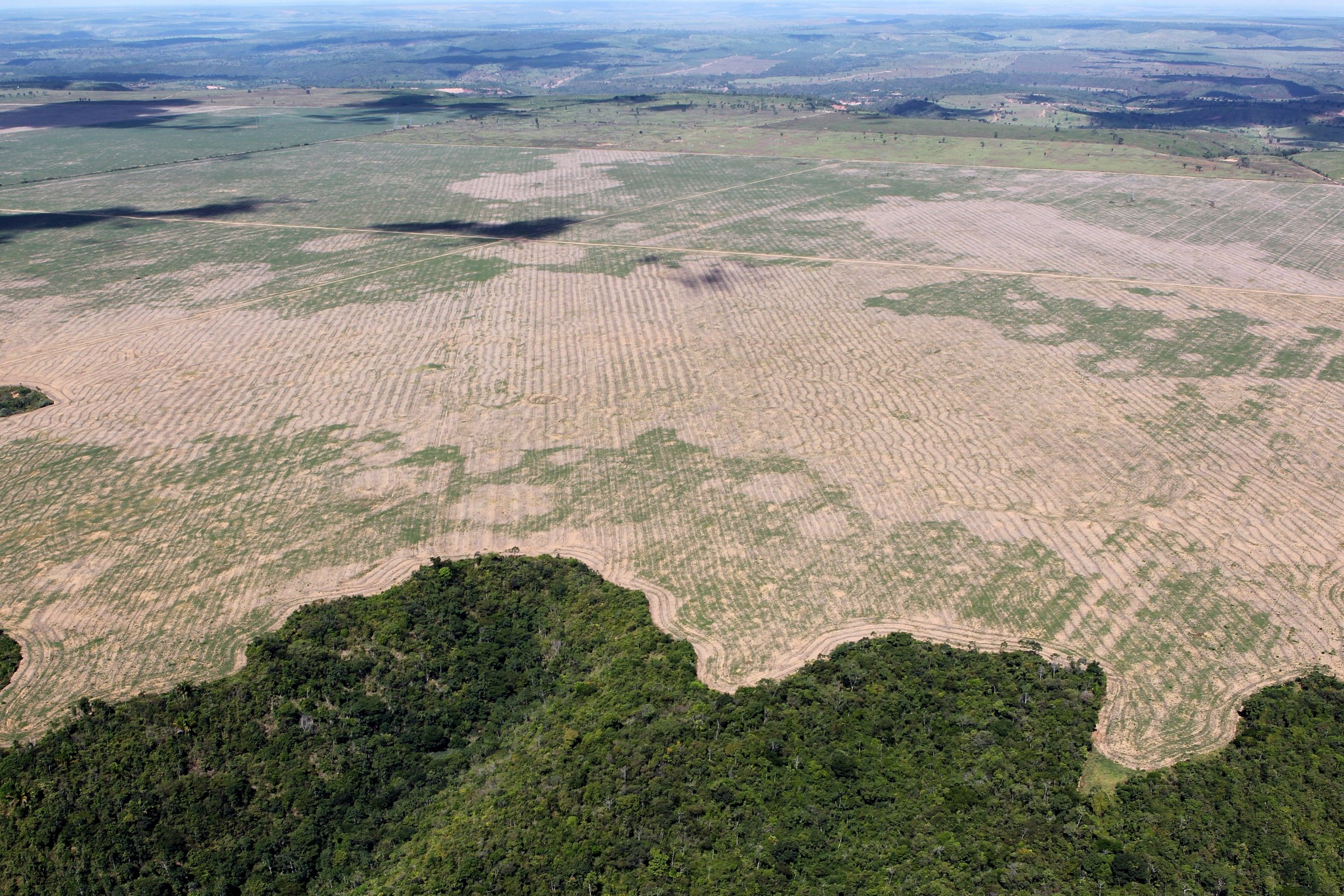
Deforestation in the Maranhão state, Brazil (2016)

Damage to the Amazon has widely been described by indigenous groups, human rights groups, politicians, academics and journalists as an ecocide and a genocide. Indigenous chiefs and human rights organizations have submitted an Article 15 communication against former president of Brazil Jair Bolsonaro to the International Criminal Court for crimes against humanity and genocide for harm to Indigenous people and destruction of the Amazon. Another has been submitted for ecocide by indigenous chiefs.

=== Gaza war ===
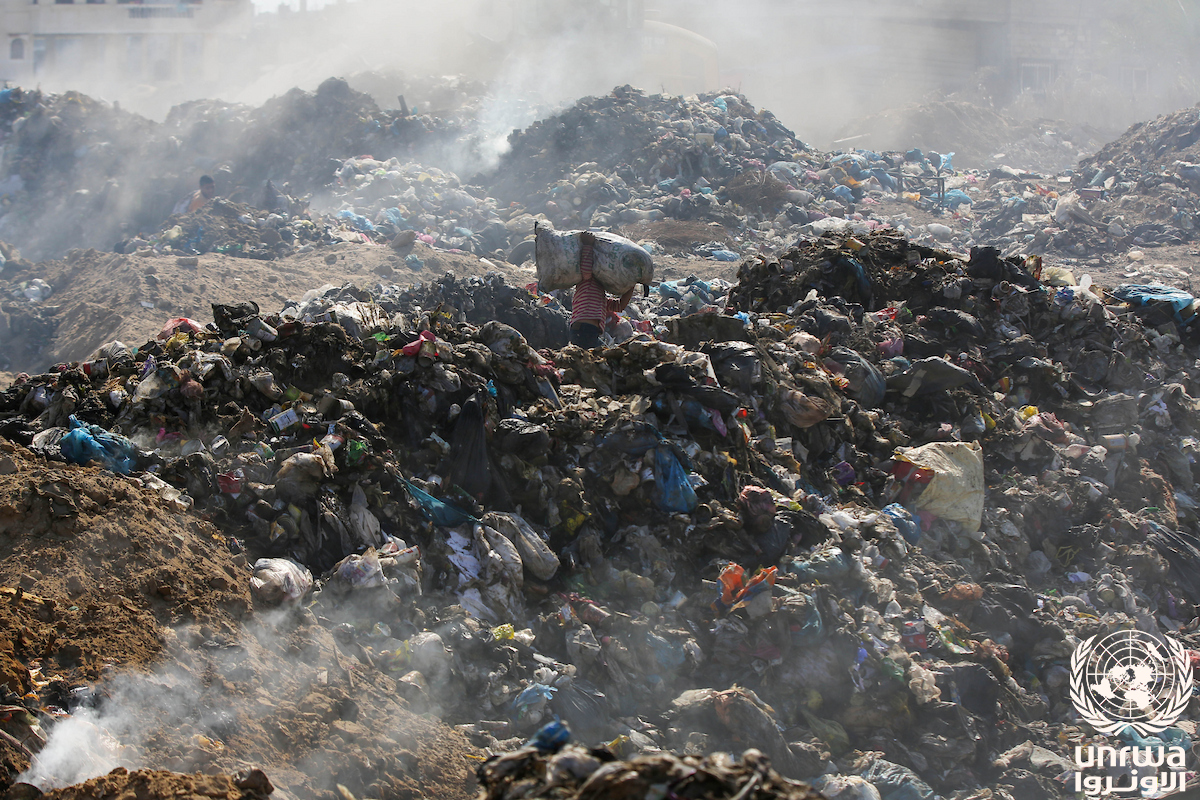
Accumulated waste in Gaza

There has been extensive environmental damage caused by the ongoing Israeli invasion of the Gaza Strip (itself a part of the Gaza war), including the destruction of agricultural land, displacement of people, bombing of Gaza, the Israeli blockade, and famine in the Gaza Strip. By March 2024, nearly half of the farmland in Gaza had been destroyed, and by the following January 80% of the tree cover had been destroyed.

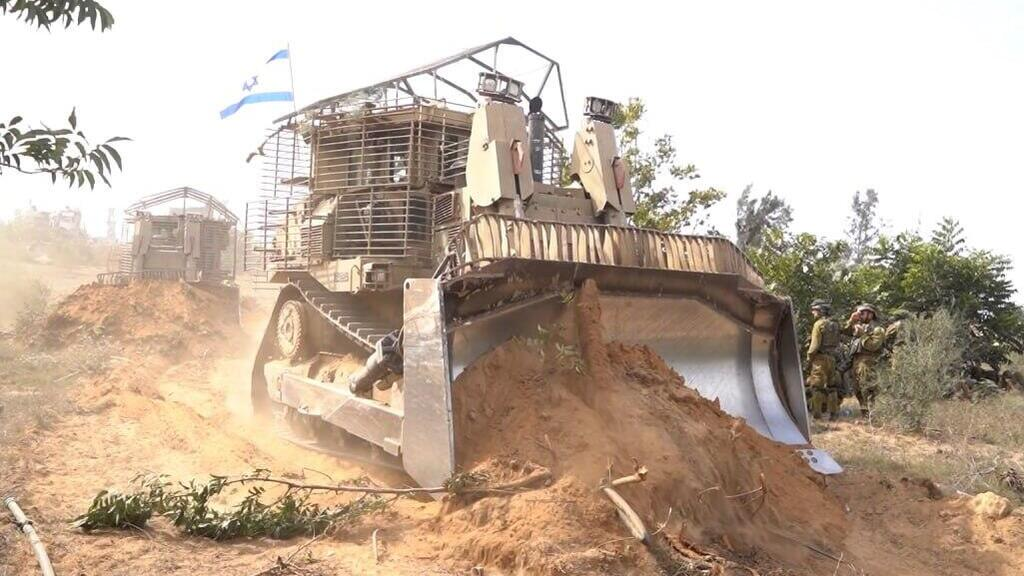
IDF bulldozer clearing trees in Gaza in October 2023

Israeli bombardment and the blockade have led to a total collapse of Gaza's civil infrastructure, including sewage treatment, waste disposal, water management, and fuel supplies. Water has been polluted by 130,000 cubic metres of sewage being discharged into the sea every day due to Israel cutting off fuel supplies. Groundwater has been contaminated by toxins and munitions and air has been polluted by smoke and particulates from bombing. Soils have been degraded by uprooting trees and contaminated by toxins, munitions, heavy bombing and demolitions. Bombing by the Israeli army has created 50 million tonnes of debris and hazardous material, much of which contains human remains and tens of thousands of bombs. In June 2024, northern Gaza was described as a "wasteland", unable to sustain life.

The size and lasting impact of the systematic and intentional destruction of agriculture in Gaza have led to calls by the research group Forensic Architecture at Goldsmiths, University of London, and the Palestinian Environmental NGOs Network for the Israeli Government to be investigated for the Rome Statute war crime of ecocide for "widespread, long-term and severe damage to the natural environment".

== International law ==
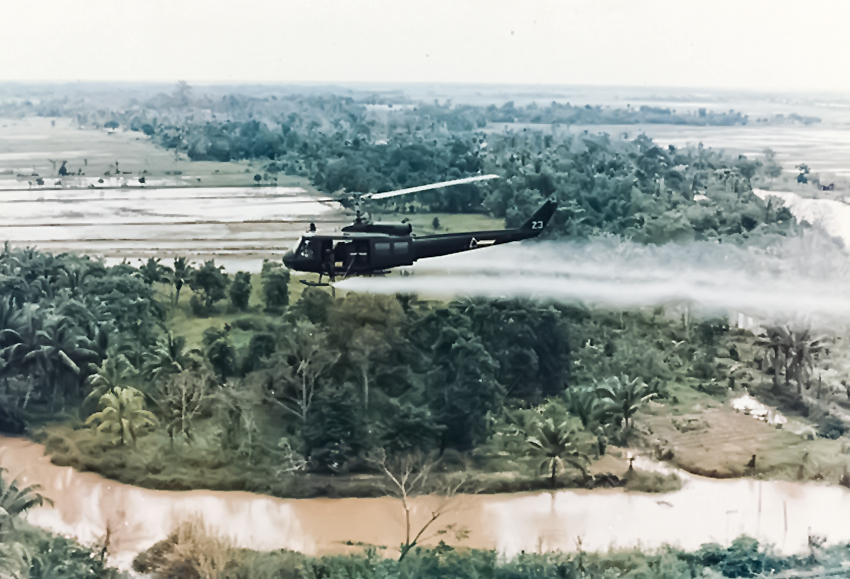
US Huey helicopter spraying Agent Orange in Vietnam.

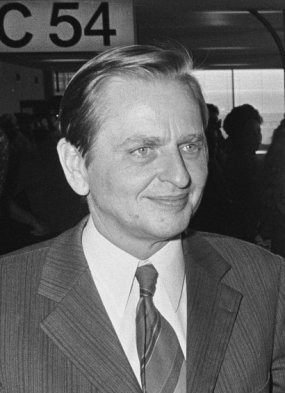
Olof Palme, 1974.

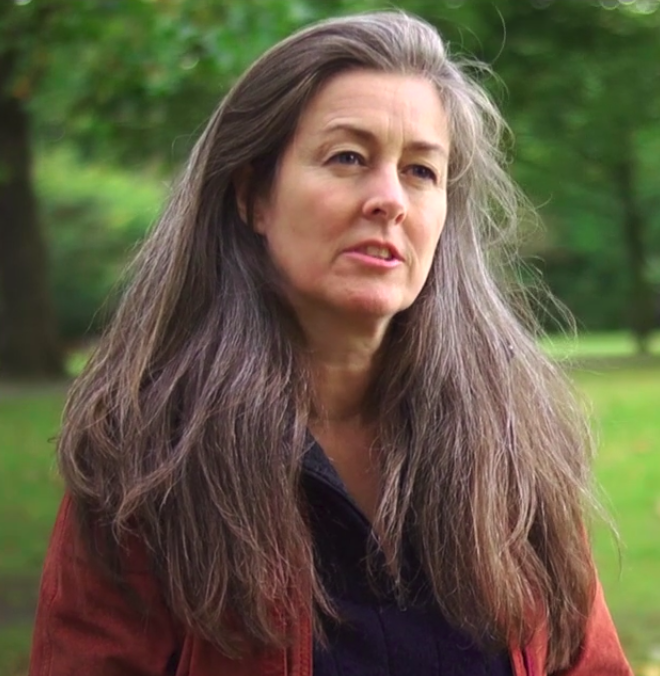
Polly Higgins.

There is no international law against ecocide that applies in peacetime, but the Rome Statute makes it a crime to:

Intentionally launch an attack in the knowledge that such attack will cause incidental loss of life or injury to civilians or damage to civilian objects or widespread, long-term and severe damage to the natural environment which would be clearly excessive in relation to the concrete and direct overall military advantage anticipated.

The UN's International Law Commission (ILC) considered the inclusion of the crime of ecocide to be included within the Draft Code of Crimes Against the Peace and Security of Mankind, the document which later became the Rome Statute. Article 26 (crime against the environment) was publicly supported by 19 countries in the Legal Committee but was removed due to opposition from the Netherlands, the United Kingdom and the United States of America.

In 1977 the United Nations adopted the Convention on the Prohibition of Military or any other Hostile use of Environmental Modification Technique. Article I of this Convention says, 'Each State Party to this Convention undertakes not to engage in military or any other hostile use of environmental modification techniques having widespread, long-lasting or severe effects as the means of destruction, damage or injury to any other State Party.' There is no definition of the terms 'widespread, long-lasting or severe'.

In February 2024, the European Parliament adopted a law making large-scale, intentionally caused, environmental damage 'comparable to ecocide' a crime that can be punished by up to 10 years in prison. Members of the states of the European Union have two years from that date to incorporate their crime into their national laws. As of early 2024, there are growing calls to recognize ecocide as an international crime.

=== Efforts to expand international ecocide law ===
Efforts to criminalise ecocide have sought to include the crime among those prosecuted by the International Criminal Court established by the Rome Statute. These crimes include genocide, crimes against humanity, war crimes and the crime of aggression.

In 2010, environmental lawyer Polly Higgins submitted a proposal to the United Nations International Law Commission that defined ecocide as:

The extensive damage to, destruction of or loss of ecosystems of a given territory, whether by human agency or by any other causes, to such an extent that peaceful enjoyment by the inhabitants of that territory has been severely diminished.

This definition includes damage caused by individuals, corporations and/or the state. It also includes environmental destruction from 'other causes' (i.e. harm that is not necessarily caused by human activity). The purpose was to create a duty of care to mitigate or prevent naturally occurring disasters as well as creating criminal responsibility for human-caused ecocide. The proposal has yet to be accepted by the United Nations.

On 22 January 2013, a committee of eleven citizens from nine European Union countries launched the European Citizens Initiative (ECI) to 'End Ecocide in Europe'. The initiative aimed at criminalizing ecocide and investments in activities causing ecocide, as well as denying market access to the EU for products derived from ecocidal activities. Three members of the European Parliament, Keith Taylor, Eva Joly, and Jo Leinen, publicly gave the first signatures. The initiative did not collect the one million signatures needed, but was discussed in the European Parliament.

In December 2019 at the 18th session of the Assembly of States Parties to the Rome Statute of the International Criminal Court, Vanuatu and the Maldives called for ecocide to be added to the Statute.

In June 2021, an international panel of lawyers submitted a definition of ecocide and proposed a draft amendment to the Rome Statute that would include ecocide among the international crimes prosecuted under the Statute. The panel included members from the UK, Senegal, the US, France, Ecuador, Bangladesh, Sierra Leone, Samoa and Norway, and their proposed definition is:

For the purpose of this Statute, "ecocide" means unlawful or wanton acts committed with knowledge that there is a substantial likelihood of severe and either widespread or long-term damage to the environment being caused by those acts.

=== Notable supporters of ecocide law ===
Many notable people have publicly supported ecocide being made a crime at the International Criminal Court. Several world leaders, environmentalists and celebrities have publicly supported ecocide being made an international crime including Pope Francis, Antonio Guterres, Greta Thunberg, Fiamē Naomi Mataʻafa, Emmanuel Macron, Jane Goodall and Paul McCartney.

At the 1972 UN Conference on the Human Environment, Swedish Prime Minister Olof Palme described the damage caused by defoliant Agent Orange in the Vietnam War as ecocide and called for it to be made an international crime. United Nations Secretary-General Antonio Guterres said in 2017 that it is 'highly desirable' to include ecocide as a crime at the International Criminal Court. Pope Francis in his address to the International Association of Penal Law in 2019 stated that 'By 'ecocide' we should understand the loss, damage and destruction of ecosystems of a given territory, so that its enjoyment by the inhabitants has been or may be severely affected. This is a fifth category of crimes against peace, which should be recognised as such by the international community.' He also stated that 'sins against ecology' should be added to Catholic teachings.

Environmentalist Jane Goodall supported ecocide being made an international crime, stating: 'The concept of Ecocide is long overdue. It could lead to an important change in the way people perceive – and respond to – the current environmental crisis.' In 2023, Greta Thunberg, Luisa Neubauer, Anuna de Wever and Adélaïde Carlier demanded, in an open letter, that all European Union leaders and heads of state must 'advocate to make ecocide an international crime at the International Criminal Court.' At the 54th session of the Human Rights Council, Volker Türk, United Nations High Commissioner for Human Rights supported ecocide being made a crime at national and international levels.

=== Stop Ecocide International ===
Stop Ecocide International (SEI) is an organisation which advocates amending the Rome Statute of the International Criminal Court to include ecocide. It works with governments, politicians, diplomats and wider society. The organisation has branches or associate groups in almost 50 countries. SEI's sister organisation, the Stop Ecocide Foundation convened the Independent Expert Panel for the Legal Definition of Ecocide.

== History ==
=== 1970s ===
The concept of ecocide originated in the 1970s after the United States devastated the environment in Vietnam through use of Agent Orange and other herbicides and defoliants during the Vietnam War. The word was first recorded at the Conference on War and National Responsibility in Washington DC, where American plant biologist and bioethicist Arthur Galston proposed a new international agreement to ban ecocide.

International law professor Richard Falk described the military tactics carried out by the United States in the Vietnam War as a form of 'environmental warfare'. He noted that the level of herbicide spraying, deforestation, and weather modification approached the level of an ecocidal crime. Falk notes how 'the facts have been officially repressed or distorted by the US Government', showcasing the level of political barriers placed to legally prohibit ecocide.

Scientific follow-up after the war has been minimal, an assessment conducted in 2021 showcased how only a single wildlife-related study has been conducted since the war occurred; meaning crucial questions about ecological recovery continue to remain unanswered. This significant gap in data has often been identified as significant governmental and academic neglect.

Despite international outrage, the United States' government have maintained a solid position that the usage of defoliants was a legitimate tactic. This perspective seemed to ensure the problem was framed as a non-permanent, secondary consequence of an important, necessary military action. Thus, this rejected the emerging concept of ecocide.

In 1972 at the United Nations Stockholm Conference on the Human Environment, Prime Minister of Sweden Olof Palme called the Vietnam War an ecocide. Others, including Indira Gandhi from India and Tang Ke, the leader of the Chinese delegation, also denounced the war in human and environmental terms, calling for ecocide to be an international crime. A Working Group on Crimes Against the Environment was formed at the conference, and a draft Ecocide Convention was submitted into the United Nations in 1973. This convention called for a treaty that would define and condemn ecocide as an international war crime, recognising that "man has consciously and unconsciously inflicted irreparable damage to the environment in times of war and peace."

The International Law Commission 1978 Yearbook's 'Draft articles on State Responsibility and International Crime' included: "an international crime (which) may result, inter alia, from: (d) a serious breach of an international obligation of essential importance for the safeguarding and preservation of the human environment, such as those prohibiting massive pollution of the atmosphere or of the seas." Supporters who spoke out in favor of a crime of ecocide included Romania, the Holy See, Austria, Poland, Rwanda, Congo and Oman.

=== 1980s ===
The Whitaker Report, commissioned by the Sub-Commission on the Promotion and Protection of Human Rights on the prevention and punishment of genocide was prepared by then Special Rapporteur, Benjamin Whitaker. The report contained a passage that states:

Some members of the Sub-Commission have, however, proposed that the definition of genocide should be broadened to include cultural genocide or "ethnocide", and also "ecocide": adverse alterations, often irreparable, to the environment – for example through nuclear explosions, chemical weapons, serious pollution and acid rain, or destruction of the rain forest – which threaten the existence of entire populations, whether deliberately or with criminal negligence.

Discussion of international crimes continued in the International Law Commission in 1987, where it was proposed that 'the list of international crimes include "ecocide", as a reflection of the need to safeguard and preserve the environment, as well as the first use of nuclear weapons, colonialism, apartheid, economic aggression and mercenarism.'

=== 1990s ===
In 1996, Canadian/Australian lawyer Mark Gray published his proposal for an international crime of ecocide, based on established international environmental and human rights law. He demonstrated that states, and arguably individuals and organizations, causing or permitting harm to the natural environment on a massive scale breach a duty of care owed to humanity in general. He proposed that such breaches, where deliberate, reckless or negligent, be identified as ecocide where they entail serious, and extensive or lasting, ecological damage; international consequences; and waste.

=== 2010s ===
In 2011, the Hamilton Group drafted a mock Ecocide Act and then tested it via a mock trial in the UK Supreme Court.

In 2012, a concept paper on the Law of Ecocide was sent out to governments. In June 2012 the idea of making ecocide a crime was presented to legislators and judges from around the world at the World Congress on Justice Governance and Law for Environmental Sustainability, held in Mangaratiba before the Rio +20 Earth Summit. Making ecocide an international crime was voted as one of the top twenty solutions to achieving sustainable development at the World Youth Congress in Rio de Janeiro in June 2012.

In October 2012 the international conference Environmental Crime: Current and Emerging Threats was held in Rome and hosted by the United Nations Interregional Crime and Justice Research Institute (UNICRI) in cooperation with United Nations Environmental Programme (UNEP) and the Ministry of the Environment (Italy). The conference recognized that environmental crime is an important new form of transnational organized crime in need a greater response. One of the outcomes was that UNEP and UNICRI head up a study into the definition of environmental crime and give due consideration to making ecocide an international crime.

In November 2019 Pope Francis, addressing the International Association of Penal Law (AIDP), called on the international community to recognize ecocide as a 'fifth category of crime against peace.'

In July 2019, a group of 24 scientists called for ecocide committed in conflict areas be punished as a war crime.

=== 2020s ===
In November 2020, a panel of international lawyers convened by Stop Ecocide International and chaired by British law professor Philippe Sands and Senegalese jurist Dior Fall Sow started drafting a proposed law criminalizing ecocide.

In May 2021, the European parliament adopted 2 reports advancing the recognition of ecocide as a crime.

In order to enforce implementation and increase citizens' trust in EU rules, and to prevent and remedy environmental damage more effectively, Parliament demands that the Environmental Liability Directive (ELD) and the Environmental Crime Directive (ECD) be improved.

Also in May 2021 the 179 members of the Inter-Parliamentary Union (IPU) passed an almost-unanimous resolution inviting member parliaments recognise the crime of ecocide.

The governments of some of the island states at risk from climate change (Fiji, Niue, the Solomon Islands, Tuvalu, Tonga and Vanuatu) launched the 'Port Vila Call for a Just Transition to a Fossil Fuel Free Pacific', calling for the phase out fossil fuels and the 'rapid and just transition' to renewable energy and strengthening environmental law including introducing the crime of ecocide.

On 16 November 2023, European Union legislators reached an agreement on a new directive with jail sentences for the worst polluters and companies fined up to 5% of their global turnover. The agreed law has been formally approved by Parliament in February 2024 and became the Directive on the protection of the environment through criminal law.

== Domestic law ==
Ten countries have codified ecocide as a crime within their borders during peacetime. Those countries followed the wording of Article 26 of the International law Commission (ILC) Draft which referred to intentionally causing "widespread, long-term and severe damage to the natural environment" within the context of war – bearing in mind that Article 26 was removed from the final draft submitted to the Rome Statute of the International Criminal Court in 1996. None of the countries established procedures to measure 'intention'.

The countries with domestic ecocide laws are (in alphabetical order):

- Armenia (2003)
- Belarus (1999)
- Belgium (2023)
- Chile (2023)
- Croatia (2026)
- Ecuador (2008; 2014)
- France (2021)
- Georgia (1999)
- Kazakhstan (1997)
- Kyrgyzstan (1997)
- Mauritius (2026)
- Moldova (2002)
- Russia (1996)
- Tajikistan (1998)
- Ukraine (2001)
- Uzbekistan (1994)
- Vietnam (1990)

=== France ===
In 2021, the French National Assembly approved the creation of an 'ecocide' offence as part of a battery of measures aimed at protecting the environment and tackling climate change.

=== Mauritius ===
In 2026, the Mauritian National Assembly amended the Environment Act, giving recognition to the crime of ecocide.

The definition adopted is based, almost word for word, on the legal definition proposed by an independent panel of jurists co-chaired by Prof Philippe Sands QC.

== In popular culture ==
See List of nuclear holocaust fiction for fiction which depicts ecocide by nuclear holocaust.

=== Movies ===
Many movies depict ecocide and its impacts including:

- Avatar
- Avatar: The Way of Water
- Blade Runner
- Blade Runner 2049
- The Book of Eli
- Children of Men
- Deepwater Horizon
- Digger
- Elysium
- FernGully: The Last Rainforest
- Hardware
- Hunger strike against Ecocide
- Interstellar
- Letter from the Age of Ecocide
- Passengers
- Mad Max
- Mad Max 2
- Mad Max Beyond Thunderdome
- Mad Max: Fury Road
- Nausicaa of the Valley of the Wind
- No Blade of Grass
- Snowpiercer
- Soylent Green
- The Day the Earth Stood Still (2008)
- Threads
- The Lorax
- Wall-E

=== TV series ===
- Arjuna
- Blade Runner: Black Lotus
- Extrapolations
- Silo
- The 100
- Travelers

=== Documentaries ===
Several documentaries explore the subject including

- Poisoning Paradise: Ecocide New Zealand
- Ecocide changer ou disparaître
- Ecocide: Voices from Paradise
- Heart of Mother Earth

== See also ==
- Ecophagy – Literal consumption of an ecosystem
- Ecotage – Sabotage for environmental reasons
- Eco-terrorism – Act of violence committed in support of environmental causes
- Environmental degradation
- Environmental disaster
- Holocene extinction – Ongoing extinction event caused by human activity
- Manslaughter § Involuntary manslaughter
- List of environmental issues
- Operation Ranch Hand – 1962–1971 US herbicidal warfare operation in the Vietnam War
- Rights of nature
- Scorched earth – Military strategy
- War on drugs § Aerial herbicide application
- Water scarcity
- Toxic colonialism – Concept in environmental sociology
