= Jack Lee (film director) =

British director, producer and screenwriter (1913–2002)

- Born: Wilfred John Raymond Lee; 27 January 1913; Slad, Gloucestershire, England
- Died: 15 October 2002 (aged 89); Sydney, Australia
- Occupations: Film director; screenwriter; editor; producer
- Family: Laurie Lee (brother)

Wilfred John Raymond Lee (27 January 1913 – 15 October 2002) was a British film director, screenwriter, editor, and producer, who directed a number of postwar films on location in Asia and Australia for The Rank Organisation.

== Biography ==
=== Early life ===
Lee was born in the village of Slad near Stroud, Gloucestershire, the eldest brother of Laurie Lee, author of Cider with Rosie. In childhood, the two boys were close but fell out in later life. Natural rivals, Jack gained a place at the grammar school (Marling School in Stroud); Laurie failed to do so, attending Stroud Central School for Boys.

=== Career ===
He directed and co-wrote the screenplay of the pioneering motorcycle speedway film Once a Jolly Swagman (1949) which starred Dirk Bogarde.

Among Jack Lee's other films are The Wooden Horse (1950), a popular Second World War POW escape film; Turn the Key Softly (1953), a realistic drama; A Town Like Alice (1956), starring Virginia McKenna and Peter Finch, based on Nevil Shute's novel; and Robbery Under Arms (1957), a Western-style adventure set in Australia, based on the 1888 bushranger novel by "Rolf Boldrewood". According to Filmink magazine "Lee wasn't the world's most energetic director – he starts the movie with Dick and Jim literally lounging on the ground in the hot sun and is overly in love with shooting action and characters in long shot."

Lee had a hit film with the comedy The Captain's Table (1959).

During the Australian feature film renaissance ushered in with Picnic at Hanging Rock, he served as chairman (from 1976 to 1981) of the South Australian Film Corporation, which started the careers of Bruce Beresford and Peter Weir.

== Personal life ==
Lee was originally engaged to be married to Hilda Lee (no relation) but the wedding was called off weeks before it was due to happen. In 1946 he married British casting director Nora Francisca Blackburne (21 April 1914 – 7 July 2009), following her divorce from Adam Alexander Dawson. They had two children before divorcing in 1963.

In 1963, he married Isabel Kidman who was an heiress to the Kidman cattle dynasty. She had two children from her previous marriage. She was not allowed to take them out of the country, so he settled in Australia, and although he returned often to Britain, he spent the rest of his life there.

== Death ==
Lee died in Sydney in October 2002.
