= Freda Dowie =

British screen actress (1928–2019)

Freda Mary Dowie
- Born: 22 July 1928; Carlisle, Cumberland, England
- Died: 10 August 2019 (aged 91); Suffolk, England
- Education: Royal Central School of Speech and Drama
- Occupation: Actress
- Years active: 1958−2009
- Spouses: Lionel Butterworth (m. 1952, divorced) John Goodrich (m. 1961, divorced) David Thompson (m. 1970; died 2019)

Freda Mary Dowie (22 July 1928 – 10 August 2019) was an English actress. Her television credits included: Dixon of Dock Green, Doomwatch, Edna, the Inebriate Woman, Upstairs, Downstairs, I, Claudius, The Old Curiosity Shop, The Pickwick Papers, Lillie, Oranges Are Not the Only Fruit, Our Friends in the North, Common As Muck, Lovejoy, Agatha Christie's Poirot, Crown Court and Heartbeat.

Dowie frequently portrayed long-suffering roles, most notably as the Mother in the 1988 film Distant Voices, Still Lives, for which she was nominated for a European Film Award. Her film career also includes roles in Subterfuge (1968), The Omen (1976), The Monk (1990), Butterfly Kiss (1995), Jude (1996), Cider with Rosie (1998), and Fragile (2005).

== Early life ==
Freda Mary Dowie was born in Carlisle, Cumbria on 22 July 1928 to John Dowie, a fried fish seller, and his wife Emily Davidson. She attended Barrow Girls Grammar School, where she excelled in Latin, English Literature and foreign languages including French and German. She later gained a place to study teaching at the Royal Central School of Speech and Drama, graduating in 1948.

== Personal life and death ==
Dowie was married three times. Her first marriage was to Lionel Butterworth in Barrow-in-Furness in 1952. She then married John Goodrich in Hampstead in 1961. Both marriages ended in divorce. Her third marriage in 1970 was to the artist and documentary filmmaker David Thompson; they remained together until his death in April 2019.

Dowie died in Suffolk on 10 August 2019, aged 91.

== Filmography ==
Year	Title	Role	Notes
1959	The Eustace Diamonds	Ellen	Episode: "Episode #1.6"
1961	ITV Television Playhouse	Waitress	Episode: "I Having Dreamt Awake"
1961	Doctor Faustus	Duchess of Vanholt	Episode: "Episode #1.2"
1961	The Wakefield Shepherd's Play	Mary	Short film
1962	Antigone	Antigone	2 episodes
1962	The Bacchae	Chorus	2 episodes
1963	BBC Sunday-Night Play	Lillian, Gimlet's conductress	Episode: "Just You Wait"
1963	Armchair Theatre	Elsie	Episode: "The Monkey and the Mowhawk"
1963	Maupassant	Mlle. Zoe	Episode: "Wives and Lovers"
1963−1967	ITV Play of the Week	Princess Marie / Bronwen Iorweth / Sarah	3 episodes
1964	Diary of a Young Man	Chief Marcher	Episode: "Relationships"
1965	It's Dark Outside	Martha Singer	Episode: "A Slight Case of a Matrimony"
1966	Sunday Night	Xanthippe	Episode: "The Death of Socrates"
1966	North and South	Fanny Thornton	4 episodes
1966	Dixon of Dock Green	Mrs. Newman	Episode: "The Golden Year"
1966	Alice in Wonderland	Nurse	Television film
1967	Dr. Finlay's Casebook	Beth Geddes	Episode: "Call in Cameron"
1967	Six Bites of the Cherry	Various roles	6 episodes
1967	The Newcomers	Staff Nurse Murdoch	2 episodes
1968	Omnibus	Maid	Episode: "Whistle and I'll Come To You"
1968	ITV Playhouse	Unknown	Episode: "The Retreat"
1968	Subterfuge	Waitress	
1969	The Incredible Adventures of Professor Branestawm	Mrs. Flittersnoop	7 episodes
1970	Thirty-Minute Theatre	Mrs. Armstrong	2 episodes
1971	Doomwatch	Hilda	Episode: "No Room for Error"
1971	Play for Today	Mother Superior	Episode: "Edna, the Inebriate Woman"
1971	Cider with Rosie	Crabby	Television film
1972	Cranford	Miss Brown	Episode: "Part 1"
1972−1975	Crown Court	Sadie Dickinson / Helen Lord	5 episodes
1973	Jack the Ripper	Amelia Palmer	Episode: "The First Two"
1973	Once Upon a Time	Mother	Episode: "Ishmael"
1973	The Brontes of Haworth	Miss Branwell	2 episodes
1974	The Carnforth Practice	Mrs. Pollock	Episode: "Undue Influence"
1974	Miss Nightingale	Sister Elizabeth Wheeler	Television film
1974	Upstairs, Downstairs	Maria Schoenfeld	Episode: "The Beastly Hun"
1974	Father Brown	Opal Banks	Episode: "The Man with Two Beards"
1975	The Hanged Man	Jean MacKinnon	Episode: "Chariot of Earth"
1975	The Poisoning of Charles Bravo	Mrs. Cox	3 episodes
1975	Within These Walls	Elsie Storbridge	Episode: "Prison Cat"
1975	The Puritan Experience: Making of a New World	Goody Adams	Short film
1976	The Omen	Nun	
1976	I, Claudius	The Sybil / Caesonia	3 episodes
1978	Angels	Mrs. Czechpinski	Episode: "First Impressions"
1978	Lillie	Mathilde Peat	Episode: "Fifty Cents a Dance"
1979−1980	The Old Curiosity Shop	Sally Brass	6 episodes
1983	Hallelujah!	Mildred Cooper	Episode: "Counselling"
1983	Zig Zag	Edith	2 episodes
1985	The Pickwick Papers	Rachel Wardle	3 episodes
1985	Cover Her Face	Alice Liddell	2 episodes
1986	Alice in Wonderland	Cook	2 episodes
1986	Lovejoy	Mrs. Springer	Episode: "Friends, Romans and Enemies"
1986	Eastenders	Clerk	Episode: "Episode #1.152"
1986	Call Me Mister	Mrs. Oaks	Episode: "Tour De Force"
1988	The Return of Sherlock Holmes	Mrs. Porter	Episode: "The Devil's Foot"
1988	Distant Voices, Still Lives	Mother	
1988	Sophia and Constance	Maria Insull	5 episodes
1989	Poirot	Eliza Dunn	Episode: "The Adventure of the Clapham Cook"
1989	Goldeneye	Harley Street doctor	Television film
1990	Oranges Are Not the Only Fruit	Mrs. Green	3 episodes
1990	The Monk	Sister Ursula	
1991	Kinsey	Maureen Spencer	Episode: "It's Going To Be a Close Call, Kinsey"
1991	Stay Lucky	Neighbour	Episode: "Shingle Beach"
1992	Thacker	Edith Folland	TV series
1992	Boon	Eileen Wooley	Episode: "Love or Money"
1992−2009	Heartbeat	Edna / Phyllis / Muriel Gerard	3 episodes
1993	Crime Story	Lady Peggy Hudson	Episode: "The Ladies Man: Archibald Hall"
1994	Middlemarch	Jane Waule	3 episodes
1994	Moving Story	Mrs. Kimball	Episode: "Last Stand at Laurel Way"
1994−1997	Common as Muck	Dulcie Green	6 episodes
1995	Butterfly Kiss	Elsie	
1996	Our Friends in the North	Florrie Hutchinson	7 episodes
1996	Jude	Elderly landlady	
1996	Beck	Freda Doyle	Episode: "Episode #1.2"
1996	Black Eyes	Gran	Short film
1997	Insiders	Peggy Edwards	Episode: "Good Behaviour"
1998	Cider with Rosie	Granny Wallon	Television film
1999	The Bill	Anne Jefferson	2 episodes
2000	Jason and the Argonaut	Hera as Old Peasant Woman	2 episodes
2000	Trick of the Light	Beatrice	Short film
2000	Maisie's Catch	Maisie	Short film
2000	Wildwood	Wise woman	Television film
2002	Outside the Edge	Freda Marshall	TV series
2002	How We Used to Live: A Giant in Ancient Egypt	Old Sarah	TV miniseries
2003	Death in Holy Orders	Agatha Betterton	2 episodes
2005	Fragile	Old Lady 1	
2007	Midsomer Murders	Amie Pearce	Episode: "The Animal Within"
2007	The Royal	Dora Rigby	Episode: "Scabs"
