= The Banks of Sweet Primroses =

English folk song

- English Folk Song
- Other name: "The Banks of the Sweet Primroses", etc.
- Catalogue: Roud 586
- Published: 1800s: England
- Publisher: Broadside

"The Banks of Sweet Primroses", "The Banks of the Sweet Primroses", "Sweet Primroses", "As I Walked Out One Midsummer Morning", "As I Rode Out" or "Stand off, Stand Off" (Roud 586) is an English folk song. It was very popular with traditional singers in the south of England, and has been recorded by many singers and groups influenced by the folk revival that began in the 1950s.

== Synopsis ==
The narrator goes out into the countryside on a midsummer morning. He sees an attractive young woman "down by the banks of the sweet primroses". He asks her where she is going and why she is distressed. He tells her he will make her "as happy as any lady" if she will grant him "one small relief". She tells him to go further away and says he is false and deceitful. She says he is responsible for making her "poor heart to wander" and that it is pointless to comfort her. She says she will go to a desolate valley where no one will be able to find her. The narrator then offers this advice to romantically-inclined young men (or, in many versions, to young women): "There's many a dark and dusky morning, turns out to be a most sunshiney day".

== Versions ==
=== Versions collected from traditional singers ===
The Roud Folk Song Index contains 329 examples (though the same version may be reprinted or distributed in more than one publication or recording and therefore generate more than one entry in the index). 92 examples were collected in England, largely in Southern England (17 versions collected in Sussex in contrast with 2 in Yorkshire). 2 were collected from singers in Wales, 2 from Scotland, and the only examples from outside Britain were from 2 singers in the same part of Nova Scotia. The earliest recorded version was by the Welsh singer Phil Tanner, recorded in 1937.

=== Broadsides ===
In the nineteenth century many publishers of Broadside ballads printed versions of "The Banks of Sweet Primroses".

=== Recordings ===
Peter Kennedy's recording of Gloucestershire singer Emily Bishop, made in 1952, is on the GlosTrad website.

Two versions by Phil Tanner are available on the CD "The Gower Nightingale". Several versions by traditional singers have been published by Topic Records in the Voice of the People series. Seamus Ennis recorded Bob, John, Jim and Ron Copper of the Copper Family of Rottingdean, Sussex singing their family version in April 1952. The song has also been recorded by Shropshire singer Fred Jordan, and the Suffolk singer Bob Hart. A rendition by Bob Hart recorded by Reg Hall is available online at the British Library Sound Archive.

Many singers involved in or inspired by the second [British Folk revival] have performed and recorded versions of "The Banks of Sweet Primroses", including Shirley Collins on her LP Sweet Primeroses, The Dubliners Fairport Convention, Martin Carthy and Dave Swarbrick, June Tabor, Martin Simpson, and Eliza Carthy.

== Discussion ==
Steve Roud writes that this song was so popular with traditional singers at the beginning of the 20th century that some collectors did not bother to note down every example. He also comments that the story seems incomplete and mysterious, in that we don't know what the narrator had done to so distress a young woman he doesn't appear to know, or why the ending is so upbeat. Ralph Vaughan Williams and A. L. Lloyd make the observation that "Tune and text have shown remarkable constancy" through many collected versions, and conclude that "Clearly, singers have found the song unusually memorable and satisfactory, for the process of oral transmission seems to have worked little change on it". The lines in the third verse "I will make you as happy as any lady / If you will grant me one small relief" are discussed an example of a consistent trope within English folk music and also commonly interpreted humorously as innuendo.

== Literary influence ==
The first line of the song was the inspiration for the title of Laurie Lee's autobiographical travel memoir As I Walked Out One Midsummer Morning.
