= Toine Manders =

Dutch lawyer and politician (born 1956)

Toine Manders MEP
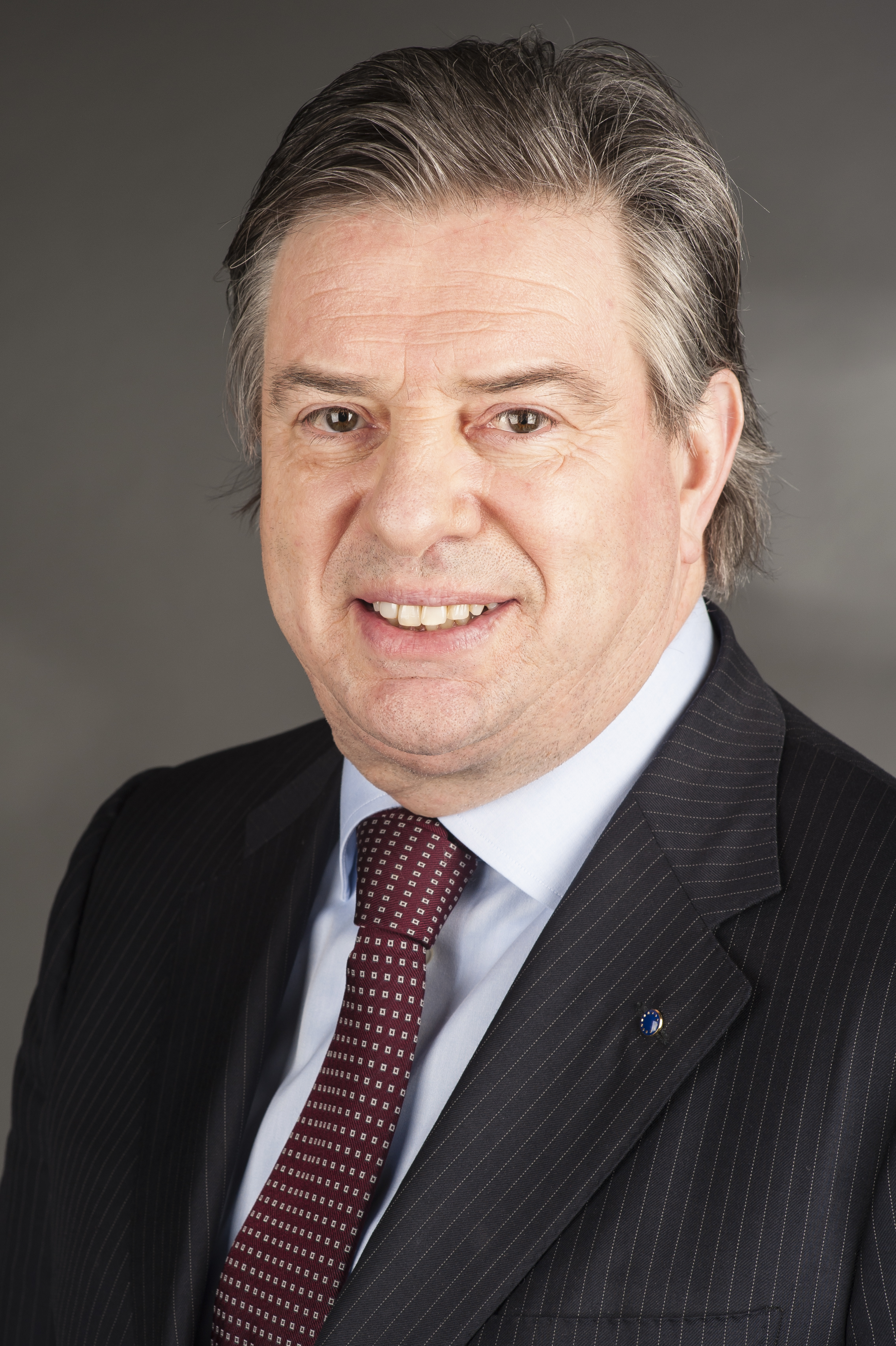

Member of the European Parliament
- In office 2 July 2019 – 15 July 2024
- Constituency: Netherlands
- In office 20 July 1999 – 30 June 2014
- Constituency: Netherlands

Personal details
- Born: Antonius Jozef Maria Manders; 14 March 1956 (age 70) Stiphout, Netherlands
- Party: Christian Democratic Appeal (2020–present)
- Other political affiliations: People's Party for Freedom and Democracy (until 2013); 50PLUS (2013–2020)
- Education: Maastricht University

Antonius Jozef Maria "Toine" Manders (born 14 March 1956) is a Dutch lawyer and politician who served as a Member of the European Parliament (MEP) in the periods 1999–2014 and 2019–2024.

He represented the People's Party for Freedom and Democracy (VVD) as part of the Alliance of Liberals and Democrats for Europe until 17 October 2013, when he changed party affiliations to lead 50PLUS (50+) in the 2014 European Parliament election, in which he failed to win reelection. Following the 2019 election, Manders returned as an MEP and joined the European People's Party Group. Starting 2 June 2020, he no longer represented 50+ but the Christian Democratic Appeal (CDA).

== Early life and education ==
Manders was born on 14 March 1956 in Stiphout. He attended the Academy for Industrial Design in Tilburg, graduating in 1982. He proceeded to study law Maastricht University, earning his degree in 1993.

== Political career ==
Manders started his political career in the municipal council of Asten, of which he was a member between 1994 and 1999. He concurrently served as a member of the States-Provincial of North Brabant since 1995. In 1999 he resigned from both positions to run for the European Parliament.

Manders served for the People's Party for Freedom and Democracy in the European Parliament from 20 July 1999 until 17 October 2013 as part of the Alliance of Liberals and Democrats for Europe. He got enough preferences votes during each of the three elections to be chosen independent of his list position. He left the People's Party for Freedom and Democracy to become the party leader for the 50PLUS party in the 2014 European Parliament election, but the party didn't get enough votes for a seat. Manders felt that his former party had switched too much toward the political right, he also agreed that the People's Party for Freedom and Democracy's decision to limit their MEP terms to three might have influenced his decision. As Manders already served three terms he would not be eligible anymore.

During the 2019 European Parliament elections in the Netherlands, he once again ran for the 50PLUS party. This time, he won a seat. On 2 June 2020, Manders left 50PLUS and joined the Christian Democratic Appeal party. He did not run for re-election in June 2024, and his term ended on 15 July 2024.

Since joining the European Parliament in 1999, Manders served on the Committee on the Internal Market and Consumer Protection. In this capacity, he was the Parliament’s rapporteur on the Environmental Liability Directive (2004). In addition to his committee assignments, he was part of the Parliament's delegation to the ACP–EU Joint Parliamentary Assembly. Manders worked on legislation mandating that bank account numbers be checked against provided names in online transactions to prevent mistaken transactions.

In 2009, Manders rejected as "outrageous" an allegation by a Protestant group that the flag of Europe is a marian symbol, saying that similar symbols were also found in ancient Greece.
