= Nora Francisca Blackburne =

British casting director and civil servant (1914–2009)

- Born: 21 April 1914; Buenos Aires, Argentina
- Died: 7 July 2009 (aged 95)
- Citizenship: British
- Education: Royal Academy of Dramatic Art
- Occupations: Casting director, civil servant
- Spouses: Adam Alexander Dawson (div. 1946) Jack Lee (div. 1963)

Nora Francesca Blackburne (21 April 1914 – 7 July 2009) was a British casting director and civil servant.

== Biography ==
Nora Francisca Blackburne was born in Buenos Aires, Argentina to a banker John Devereaux Blackburne and Francisca Nazaria López. She was educated at South Hampstead High School and then RADA (class of 1935). As a striking young woman amongst a very exciting and creative and mostly male crew at the Ministry of Information's Crown Film Unit its leader Ian Dalrymple saw she needed a challenge and made her the Assistant to the pioneering documentary film-maker Humphrey Jennings. She met her future husband Jack Lee there. He was the elder brother of Laurie Lee, and became a film director post war. Her two sons survive her. Later she had a series of jobs including working at the National Coal Board's staff college, The Vache, Chalfont St Giles, Buckinghamshire, former home of her first husband, Adam Alexander Dawson.

== Personal life ==
She was first married to Adam Alexander Dawson, and secondly to film director Jack Lee. Both of her marriages ended in divorce, the first in 1946 and the second marriage ended in divorce in 1963.
