= Port Vila Call for a Just Transition to a Fossil Fuel Free Pacific =

Pacific climate change forum

Port Vila Call for a Just Transition to a Fossil Fuel Free Pacific is a forum intended to call for the phase-out of fossil fuels in line with the Paris Agreement's limitation to warming being only 1.5 °C (34.7 °F) or below and the 'rapid and just transition' to renewable energy and strengthening environmental law, including introducing the criminalization of ecocide.

The forum stated that policymakers should join the Beyond Oil and Gas Alliance (BOGA) and support the UN General Assembly Resolution.

== History ==
Vanuatu and Tuvalu co-hosted the second Pacific Ministerial Dialogue in Port Vila, Vanuatu, on March 15–17, 2023, in partial response to the two Category 4 Judy and Kevin cyclones that were started on around March 1, 2023. The minister and officials of Vanuatu, Tuvalu, Fiji, Niue, the Solomon Islands, and Tonga met for a Pacific Islands Forum Economic Ministers Meeting in Suva, Fiji. The Pacific Islands Forum Secretariat was tasked with progressing the discussions. On August 14, 2023, the forum was accepted.

Ralph Regenvanu, Vanuatu's Climate Change Minister, had urged the New Zealand government not to reverse the ban on fossil fuel exploration. In response, Gerry Brownlee, the representative of the new government, stated that he had not underestimated the importance of fossil fuel extraction as an issue.
