= Polly Higgins =

Scottish barrister, author, and environmental lobbyist (1968–2019)

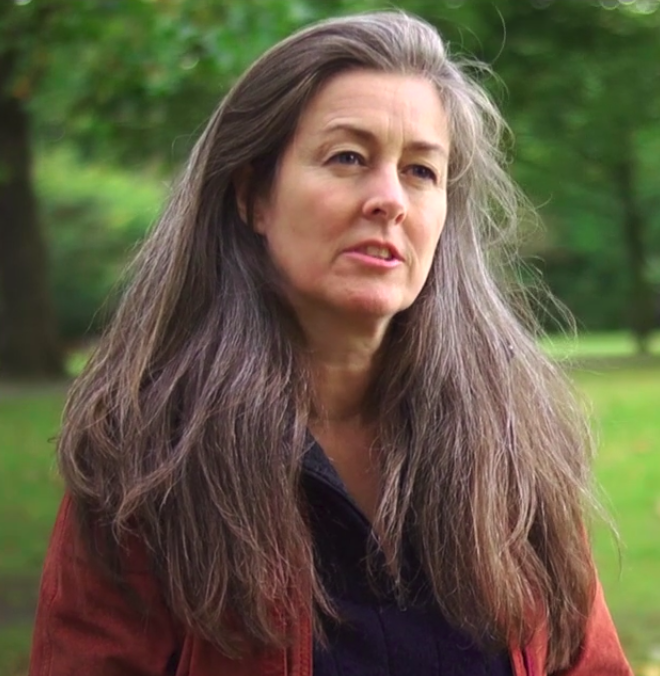
- Higgins in 2012
- Born: Pauline Hélène Higgins; 4 July 1968; Glasgow, Scotland
- Died: 21 April 2019 (aged 50); Leckhampton, England
- Education: University of Aberdeen; Utrecht University; University of Glasgow; City Law School
- Occupations: Lawyer; environmental advocate; author
- Organization: Earth Protectors
- Notable work: Eradicating Ecocide
- Movement: Criminalizing ecocide in international law
- Spouse: Ian Lawrie (m. 2002)

Pauline Hélène "Polly" Higgins FRSGS (4 July 1968 – 21 April 2019) was a Scottish barrister, author, and environmental lobbyist, described by Jonathan Watts in her obituary in The Guardian as, "one of the most inspiring figures in the green movement". She left her career as a lawyer to focus on environmental advocacy, and unsuccessfully lobbied the United Nations Law Commission to recognise ecocide as an international crime. Higgins wrote three books, including Eradicating Ecocide, and started the Earth Protectors group to raise funds to support the cause.

== Early life and education ==
Higgins was born in Glasgow and raised in Blanefield, just south of the Highland Boundary Fault at the foot of the Campsie Hills in Scotland. Her father was a meteorologist during the Second World War and her mother was an artist. The family commitment to climate and green issues influenced her early years. After attending the Glasgow Jesuit school St Aloysius' College (1986) she completed her first degree from the University of Aberdeen (1990) and also gained a First Class Diploma from Utrecht University and a Post-graduate degree University of Glasgow (1991). During her university years, she collaborated with Friedensreich Hundertwasser, an artist and environmental activist from Austria. They later went to Vienna, where she was influenced by the European ecology movement. In 2013, she earned a Doctor Honoris Causa from Business School Lausanne, Switzerland.

She trained in law at City University and the Inns of Court School of Law in London; in 1998, she was called to the Bar (in England). She practised as a lawyer based in London, specialising in corporate law and employment.

== Advocacy ==
At the end of a three-year case representing a person who had been injured at work, Higgins described looking out the window at the Court of Appeal and thinking "The earth is being injured and harmed as well and nothing is being done about it" and "the earth is in need of a good lawyer". Subsequently, she stopped practising as a barrister to focus on advocating for an international law that would hold business executives and governments to account by rendering them criminally liable for the environmental harm that they cause. George Monbiot describes the impact this might have.

Ecocide had been proposed as one of the international crimes against peace in 1996, but failed to be included in the final Rome Statute of the International Criminal Court. Higgins started to campaign for its inclusion in around 2009. She explained in 2010 that ecocide "leads to resource depletion, and where there is escalation of resource depletion, war comes chasing behind. Where such destruction arises out of the actions of mankind, ecocide can be regarded as a crime against peace." She lobbied the United Nations Law Commission to recognise ecocide as an international crime, but at the time of her death, this goal had not been achieved.

As part of her campaign, Higgins wrote Eradicating Ecocide and started the Earth Protectors fundraising group. She was a founder of the Earth Law Alliance. In 2009, Higgins was described by The Ecologist magazine as "one of the world's top ten visionary thinkers". She was ranked number 35 in Salt magazine's 2016 Top 100 Inspiring Women of the world list.

== Personal life ==
After leaving Scotland, Higgins lived in London and later settled near Stroud. In 2002, she married Ian Lawrie, a judge and QC.

In March 2019, Higgins was diagnosed with terminal lung cancer and given about six weeks to live; her diagnosis was publicly disclosed at the time by George Monbiot. She died at a hospice in Leckhampton, Gloucestershire, on 21 April 2019, at the age of 50. She is buried in Slad, Gloucestershire.

== Selected publications ==
Books

- Eradicating Ecocide: Laws and Governance to Prevent the Destruction of Our Planet (2010)
- Earth Is Our Business: Changing the Rules of the Game (2012) (ISBN 978-0856832888)
- I Dare you to be Great (2014) (ISBN 978-1909477469)
- Dare to be Great (2020) (ISBN 978-0750994101) (re-publication with new introduction & appendices)

Papers

- Higgins, Polly; Short, Damien; South, Nigel (2013). "Protecting the planet: A proposal for a law of ecocide". Crime, Law and Social Change. 59 (3): 251–266. doi:10.1007/s10611-013-9413-6. S2CID 145471989.

== Honours and Recognitions ==
- 1998 - Call to the Bar
- 2009 - The Ecologist - One of the world's top ten visionary thinkers who "demonstrated a clear vision for a better world"
- 2010-11 - The People's Book Prize – Non-fiction – Eradicating Ecocide by Polly Higgins
- 2012 - Rachel Carson 50th Anniversary Memorial Lecture 2012 (London and the Netherlands) - "Ending the Era of Ecocide" (Ecocide – the Fifth Crime Against Peace)
- 2013-14 - Arne Naess Professorial Chair (non-academic) in Global Justice and the Environment at the University of Oslo, Norway
- 2016 - Salt Magazine: - Salt and Diageo's Top 100 Inspiring Women of the World, #35 Polly Higgins
- 2017 - Honor of Ekotopfilm, Slovakia, "Her proposal to extend the jurisdiction of the International Criminal Court would define ecocide as an international crime alongside genocide, war crimes, crimes against humanity and crimes of aggression."
- 2019 - Ekotopfilm, Slovakia - Prize of the International Jury in Memory of Polly Higgins

=== Scottish decorations ===
- Royal Scottish Geographical Society: - Shackleton Medal, 2018

== Awards ==
Eradicating Ecocide was voted non-fiction winner of the national People's Book Prize in 2011. Higgins delivered the Rachel Carson Memorial Lecture in 2012. She held an honorary (non-academic) Arne Naess Professorship at the University of Oslo (2013–14) and received an honorary doctorate from the Business School Lausanne, Switzerland (2013). She was awarded an honorary fellowship of the Royal Scottish Geographical Society in 2018. Her other awards include Polarbröd's Utstickarpriset for Future Leadership (2016) and a Slovak Ekotopfilm Award (2017).
