= A Moment of War =

Book by Laurie Lee

- First edition (UK)
- Author: Laurie Lee
- Cover artist: Keith Bowen
- Publisher: Penguin Books (UK); Viking Press (US)
- Publication date: 1991
- Pages: 178
- ISBN: 1565840607
- Dewey Decimal: 914.60481
- LC Class: DP264.L385 L4 1991
- Preceded by: As I Walked Out One Midsummer Morning

A Moment of War (1991) by the British author Laurie Lee is the last book of his semi-autobiographical trilogy. It covers his months as a combatant in the Spanish Civil War from 1937 to 1938. The preceding books of the trilogy are Cider With Rosie (1959) and As I Walked Out One Midsummer Morning (1969).

The book describes how, in December 1937, Lee set out for Spain to fight for the Republican cause. He could not persuade anyone to help him and so eventually crossed the Pyrenees alone in a snowstorm. He then encountered Republican sympathisers who suspected him of being a Nationalist spy and imprisoned him. On the day scheduled for his execution a fortunate encounter led to his being released and joining the International Brigades. The book then recounts Lee's experiences as a Republican soldier in Figueres, Valencia, Tarazona, Madrid, Teruel and Barcelona. He left Spain in February 1938.

There has been some doubt about the historical accuracy of the book. Lee himself wrote that his diaries had been stolen and so he relied on memory for what is presented as an eyewitness account.
