= As I Walked Out One Midsummer Morning =

1969 memoir by Laurie Lee

- First edition (UK)
- Author: Laurie Lee
- Illustrator: Leonard Rosoman
- Cover artist: Shirley Thompson
- Publisher: André Deutsch (UK); Atheneum Publishers (US); David R. Godine, Publisher (US)
- Publication date: 1969
- ISBN: 0-233-96117-8
- OCLC: 12104039
- Dewey Decimal: 914.6/0481 19
- LC Class: PR6023.E285 Z463 1985
- Preceded by: Cider with Rosie
- Followed by: A Moment of War

As I Walked Out One Midsummer Morning (1969) is a memoir by the British writer Laurie Lee. Lee is probably best known for his autobiographical work, although he was also a poet. As I Walked Out One Midsummer Morning is the middle work in a trilogy which begins with Cider with Rosie which detailed his early life in Gloucestershire after the First World War. In this sequel Lee leaves the security of Slad his Cotswold village to embark on a journey to Spain. The third book, A Moment of War is also set in Spain.

It is 1934, and Lee walks to London from his Cotswolds home. He lives by playing the violin and, later, labouring on a building site in London. After this work draws to a finish, and having picked up the Spanish for "Will you please give me a glass of water?", he decides to go to Spain. He scrapes together a living by playing his violin outside cafés, and sleeps at night in his blanket under the open sky or in cheap, rough posadas. For a year he tramps through Spain, from Vigo in the north to the south coast, where he is trapped by the outbreak of the Spanish Civil War. He is warmly welcomed by the Spaniards he meets and enjoys a generous hospitality even from the poorest villagers he encounters along the way.

== Synopsis ==
In 1934 Laurie Lee leaves his home in Gloucestershire for London. He visits Southampton and first tries his luck at playing his violin in the street. His apprenticeship proves profitable and he decides to move eastwards. He makes his way along the south coast, and then turns inland and heads north for London. There he meets his half-American girlfriend, Cleo, who is the daughter of an anarchist.

Cleo's father finds him a job as a labourer and he rents a room, but has to move on as the room is taken over by a prostitute. He lives in London for almost a year as a member of a gang of wheelbarrow pushers. Once the building nears completion he knows that his time is up and decides to go to Spain because he knows the Spanish for "Will you please give me a glass of water?"

He lands in Galicia in July 1935. Joining up with three young German musicians, he accompanies them around Vigo and then they split up outside Zamora. By August 1935 he reaches Toledo, where he has a meeting with the South African poet Roy Campbell and his family, whom he comes across while playing his violin. They invite him to stay in their house.

Lee heads south to the Sierra Morena mountains. He decides to turn west and follow the Guadalquivir, reaching the sea by September. He turns eastwards, "heading along the bare coastal shelf of Andalusia". He hears talk of war in Abyssinia. He arrives at Tarifa, making another stop over in Algeciras. He decides to follow the coast round Spain, and sets off for Málaga, stopping in Gibraltar. During his last days in Malaga his violin breaks. After his new line of work, acting as a guide to British tourists, is curtailed by local guides, he meets a young German who gives him a violin.

In the winter of 1935 Lee decides to stay in Almuñécar (in earlier editions disguised as "Castillo"). He manages to get work in a hotel. Lee and his friend Manolo, the hotel's waiter, drink in the local bar alongside the other villagers. Manolo is the leader of a group of fishermen and labourers, and they discuss the expected revolution.

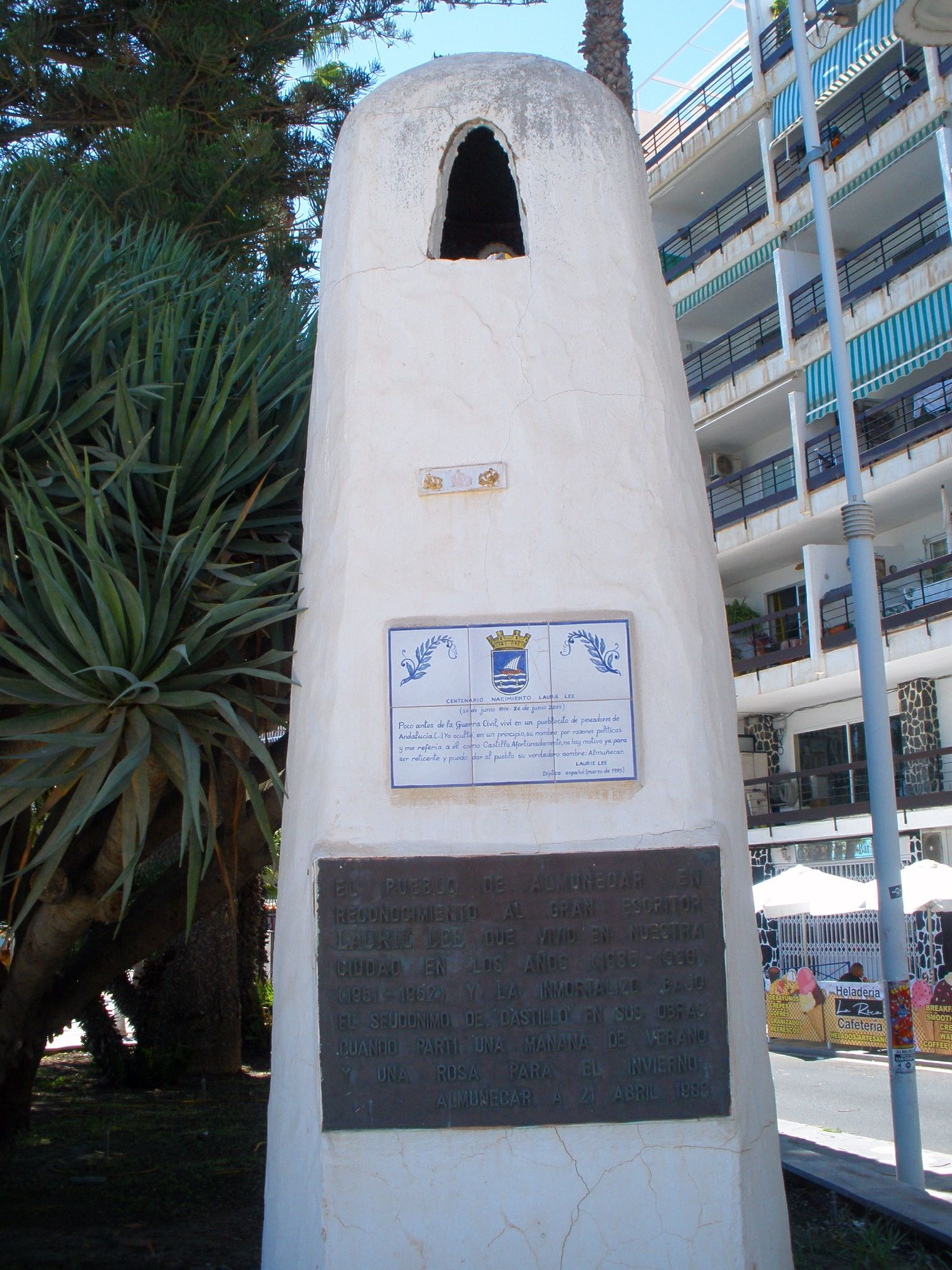
Monument to Lee in Almuñécar

In February 1936 the Socialists win the election and the Popular Front begins. In the spring the villagers burn down the church, but then change their minds. In the middle of May there is a strike and the peasants come in from the countryside to lend their support, as the village splits between Fascists and Communists.

In the middle of July 1936 war breaks out. Manolo helps to organise a militia. Granada is held by the rebels, and so is Almuñécar's neighbour Altofaro. A British destroyer from Gibraltar arrives to pick up any British subjects who might be marooned on the coast and Lee is taken on board.

The epilogue describes Lee's return to his family home in Gloucestershire and his desire to help his comrades in Spain. He finally manages to make his way through France and crosses the Pyrenees into Spain in December 1937.

== Title ==
The title of the book is the first line of the Gloucestershire folk song "The Banks of Sweet Primroses".

== Critical responses ==
The book is regarded as a classic. In 2014, the centenary of Lee´s birth, it was reissued in Penguin Classics.

Robert McFarlane, whose The Old Ways: A Journey On Foot, was published in 2012, provided an introduction to the Penguin Classics edition. For McFarlane, As I Walked Out is about movement, whereas Cider with Rosie is about staying in one place. He praises Lee's use of metaphor and argues that the "rose-tinted" descriptions in Cider with Rosie are replaced by "very dark passages". McFarlane compares Lee's travels with those of his contemporary, Patrick Leigh Fermor. Both walked across parts of Europe that were in political turmoil between the world wars.
