= Adam Alexander Dawson =

Film and television editor

- Born: 20 March 1913; Edinburgh, Scotland
- Died: 29 January 2010 (aged 96)
- Education: Edinburgh Academy; Stowe School; The Queen's College, Oxford
- Occupations: Film and television editor
- Spouse: Nora Francisca Blackburne

Adam Alexander Dawson (20 March 1913 – 29 January 2010) was a Scottiah film and television editor.

== Biography ==
Dawson was born at 33 Royal Terrace, Edinburgh, son of Alexander Bashall Dawson and Aileen Twentyman Smithers. He was a descendant of both the Dawson whisky family of St Magdalenes Distillery, Linlithgow, and the Gillon whisky family of Leith.

Dawson was educated at Edinburgh Academy, Stowe School, and The Queen's College, Oxford where he was President of the Oxford University Film Society.

He joined the Royal Berkshire Regiment and from 1942 to 1946, he edited and produced many training films for the Army while in India.

He subsequently worked for Nettlefold Studios and for the BBC as a film editor. While working for the BBC he edited a number of productions, including Z-Cars, Doctor Who and The Benny Hill Show, although he refused to have his name in the credits of the latter. Among his films are Knight Without Armour (1937), The Conquest of the Air (1940), The Glass Mountain (1949), Old Mother Riley's New Venture (1949), Mister Drake's Duck (1951), A Place in the Country (1967), The World of Coppard (1968), The World His Challenge (1967), The Highland Jaunt (1968) and the Doctor Who serial Spearhead from Space (1970).

He was married three times. His first marriage in 1942 to Nora Francisca Blackburne ended in a divorce in 1946 following Nora's affair with the director Jack Lee, whom she subsequently married. In December 1946 he married Elizabeth Grice, and in 1983 married Pamela Gwyneth Ward (née Owen-Williams).
