= World Youth Congress =

Global youth leadership event

For the movement in the 1930s, the First World Youth Congress in 1936, and the Second World Youth Congress in 1938, see World Youth Congress Movement.

The World Youth Congress is an international event hosted in a multitude of countries since its beginning in 1999. It is for young leaders to come together and discuss world issues. At the first World Youth Congress, which was held in Hawaii in 1999, about 1000 local and international delegates from nearly 180 countries attended.

== World Youth Congress Locations ==
- 1st World Youth Congress Honolulu, Hawaii (1999)
- 2nd World Youth Congress Rabat, Morocco (2003)
- 3rd World Youth Congress Scotland (2005)
- 4th World Youth Congress Quebec, Canada (2008)
- 5th World Youth Congress Istanbul, Turkey (2010)
- 6th World Youth Congress Rio de Janeiro, Brazil (2012)
- 7th World Youth Congress Honolulu, Hawaii (2017)

The 2017 World Youth Congress, held at University of Hawaii at Manoa, took place from June 17–25. This congress was based around the United Nations Sustainable Development Goals, with different "HUI groups" focusing on aspects of sustainability, including clean energy, and waste management.

== Purpose ==
The World Youth Congress aims to promote youth empowerment and to allow young people to create intercountry and intercultural relations with people from different backgrounds.
