= Dior Fall Sow =

Senegalese jurist and legal scholar (born 1968)

Elisabeth Dior Fall Sow is a Senegalese jurist and legal scholar. She was the first female prosecutor in Senegal, appointed to the Republic at the Court of First Instance of Saint-Louis in 1976. She is honorary president of the Association of Women Jurists.

== Life ==
In 1976 Dior Fall Sow was appointed Public Prosecutor in Saint-Louis, making her Senegal's first female prosecutor. She has been National Director of Education Supervision and Social Protection, Director of Legal Affairs at Sonatel-Orange, Legal Advisor to the International Criminal Tribunal for Rwanda, Principal Attorney General for the Court of Appeals of the Criminal Court of Justice of Rwanda, and Consultant for the International Criminal Court.

After making a UNICEF-funded study to harmonize Senegalese law in accordance with UN conventions, Dior Fall Sow headed a team which drafted Senegal's 1999 law outlawing female genital mutilation.

From 2001 to 2005 she was a member of the African Committee of Experts on the Rights and Welfare of the Child.

In 2015 she was made Honorary President of the Network of journalists in Gender and Human Rights. She retired in 2017.

== Works ==
- 'The Rights of Children in the African Judicial System', in E. Verhellen (ed.) Understanding Children's Rights, University of Ghent, 1996.
