= Cider with Rosie =

Book by Laurie Lee

- First edition
- Author: Laurie Lee
- Illustrator: John Stanton Ward
- Cover artist: John Stanton Ward
- Language: English (UK)
- Published: 1959 (Hogarth Press)
- Publication place: United Kingdom
- Media type: Print
- Pages: 284
- Followed by: As I Walked Out One Midsummer Morning

Cider with Rosie is a 1959 book by Laurie Lee (published in the US as Edge of Day: Boyhood in the West of England, 1960). It is the first book of a trilogy that continues with As I Walked Out One Midsummer Morning (1969) and A Moment of War (1991). It has sold over six million copies worldwide.

The novel is an account of Lee's childhood in the village of Slad, Gloucestershire, England, during and after the First World War. It chronicles the traditional village life which disappeared with the advent of new developments, such as the coming of the motor car and relates the experiences of childhood seen from many years later. The identity of Rosie was revealed years later to be Lee's distant cousin Rosalind Buckland.

== Summary ==
Rather than follow strict chronological order, Lee divided the book into thematic chapters, as follows:

- First Light describes Laurie arriving with his mother and the rest of the family at a cottage in the Cotswolds village of Slad, Gloucestershire. The children gorge themselves on berries and bread as their harassed mother tries to get the cottage and the furniture into some kind of order. The house relies on a small wood-fire for the cooking and a hand pump in the scullery for its water. They are visited by a man in uniform who is sleeping out in the surrounding woods – he visits them in the mornings for food and to dry out his damp clothes. He is finally taken off by men in uniform as a deserter. The chapter ends with the villagers riotously celebrating the end of the Great War.
- First Names describes Laurie still sleeping in his mother's bed until he is forced out of it by his younger brother, Tony, and made to sleep with the two elder boys. As he grows older, he starts to recognise the villagers as individuals: Cabbage-Stump Charlie, the local bruiser; Albert the Devil, a deaf mute beggar; and Percy-from-Painswick, a clown and ragged dandy who likes to seduce the girls with his soft tongue. Because of its location, the cottage is in the path of the floods that flow into the valley, and Laurie and his family have to go outside to clear the storm drain every time there is a heavy downpour, though even this sometimes fails to stop the sludge despoiling their kitchen.
- Village School

The village school at that time provided all the instruction we were likely to ask for. It was a small stone barn divided by a wooden partition into two rooms – The Infants and The Big Ones. There was one dame teacher, and perhaps a young girl assistant. Every child in the valley crowding there, remained till he was fourteen years old, then was presented to the working field or factory, with nothing in his head more burdensome than a few mnemonics, a jumbled list of wars, and a dreamy image of the world's geography.

The female teacher is called Crabby B, because of her predilection for suddenly hitting out at the boys for no apparent reason. She meets her match in Spadge Hopkins, a burly local farmer's boy, who leaves the classroom one day after placing her on top of one of the cupboards. She is replaced by Miss Wardley from Birmingham, who "wore sharp glass jewellery" and imposes discipline that is "looser but stronger".

- The Kitchen This chapter describes the Lees' domestic life. At the beginning Lee makes a reference to his father, who had abandoned them, saying that he and his brothers never knew any male authority. After working in the Army Pay Corps their father entered the Civil Service and settled in London for good. As Lee says,

Meanwhile we lived where he had left us; a relic of his provincial youth; a sprawling, cumbersome, countrified brood too incongruous to carry with him. He sent us money and we grew up without him; and I, for one, scarcely missed him. I was perfectly content in this world of women, muddle-headed though it might be, to be bullied and tumbled through the hand-to-mouth days ...

Lee describes each member of the family and their daily routine, his sisters going off to work in shops or at looms in Stroud and the younger boys trying to avoid their mother's chores. In the evenings the whole family sits around the big kitchen table, the girls gossiping and sewing as the boys do their homework and the eldest son, Harold, who is working as a lathe handler, mends his bicycle.

- Grannies in the Wainscot describes the two old women who were the Lees' neighbours, Granny Trill and Granny Wallon, who were permanently at war with each other. Granny Wallon, or 'Er-Down-Under, spends her days gathering the fruits of the surrounding countryside and turning them into wines that, over the course of a year, slowly ferment in their bottles. Granny Trill, or 'Er-Up-Atop, spends her days combing her hair and reading her almanacs. As a young girl she had lived with her father, a woodsman, and she still seeks comfort in the forest. The two old women arrange everything so that they never meet, shopping on different days, using different paths down the bank to their homes, and continuously rapping on their floors and ceilings. One day Granny Trill is taken ill and quickly fades away. She is soon followed by Granny Wallon, who loses her will to live.
- Public Death, Private Murder describes the murder of a villager made good who returns from New Zealand to visit his family, boasts about his wealth and flaunts it in the local pub. The police try to find his attackers but are met by a wall of silence and the case is never closed.
- Mother is Lee's tribute to his mother, Annie (née Light). Having been forced to leave school early because of her mother's death and the need to look after her brothers and father, she then went into domestic service, working as a maid in large houses. Having left to work for her father in his pub, The Plough, she then answered an advertisement, "Widower (four children) Seeks Housekeeper" and met the man who became Lee's father. After four happy years together, and three more children, he abandoned them. Lee describes his mother as having a love for everything and an extraordinary ability with plants, being able to grow anything anywhere. As he says,

Her flowers and songs, her unshaken fidelities, her attempts at order, her relapses into squalor, her near madness, her crying for light, her almost daily weeping for her dead child-daughter, her frisks and gaieties, her fits of screams, her love of man, her hysterical rages, her justice towards each of us children – all these rode my Mother and sat on her shoulders like a roosting of ravens and doves.

- Winter and Summer describes the two seasons affecting the village and its inhabitants. During one particularly cold winter the village boys go foraging with old cocoa-tins stuffed with burning rags to keep their mittenless hands warm. The week before Christmas the church choir goes carol-singing, which involves a five-mile tramp through deep snow. Calls at the homes of the squire, the doctor, the merchants, the farmers and the mayor soon fill their wooden box with coins as they light their way home with candles in jam jars. In contrast, the long hot summer days are spent outdoors in the fields, followed by games of "Whistle-or-'Oller-Or-We-shall-not-foller" at night.
- Sick Boy is an account of the various illnesses Lee suffered as a young boy, some of which brought him to the brink of death. He also writes about the death of his four-year-old sister Frances, who died unexpectedly when Lee was an infant.
- The Uncles is a vivid description of his mother's brothers, his uncles Charlie, Ray, Sid and Tom. All of them fought as cavalrymen in the Great War and then settled back on the land, though Ray emigrated to Canada to work on the transcontinental railway, the Canadian Pacific, before returning home.
- Outings and Festivals is devoted to the annual village jaunts and events. Peace Day in 1919 is a colourful affair, the procession ending up at the squire's house, where he and his elderly mother make speeches. The family also makes a four-mile hike to Sheepscombe to visit their grandfather and Uncle Charlie and his family. There is also a village outing on charabancs to Weston-super-Mare where the women sunbathe on the beach, the men disappear down the side-streets into pubs and the children amuse themselves in the arcade on the pier, playing the penny machines. There is also the Parochial Church Tea and Annual Entertainment, to which Laurie and his brother Jack gain free admittance for helping with the arrangements. They finally get to gorge themselves on the food laid out on the trestle-tables in the schoolhouse and Laurie plays his fiddle accompanied by Eileen on the piano to raucous applause.
- First Bite at the Apple describes the growth of the boys into young adolescents and the first pangs of love. Lee states that "quiet incest flourished where the roads were bad", and states that the village neither approved nor disapproved, but neither did it complain to authority. Lee is seduced by Rosie Burdock underneath a hay wagon after drinking cider from a flagon:

Never to be forgotten, that first long secret drink of golden fire, juice of those valleys and of that time, wine of wild orchards, of russet summer, of plump red apples, and Rosie's burning cheeks. Never to be forgotten, or ever tasted again...

There is also a plan among half a dozen of the boys to rape Lizzy Berkeley, a fat 16-year-old who writes religious messages on trees in the wood, on the way back from church. They wait for her one Sunday morning in Brith Wood, but when Bill and Boney accost her she slaps them twice and they lose courage, allowing her to run away down the hill. Lee says that Rosie eventually married a soldier, while Jo, his young first love, grew fat with a Painswick baker and lusty Bet, another of his sweethearts, went to Australia.

- Last Days describes the gradual breaking up of the village community with the appearance of motor cars and bicycles. The death of the squire coincides with the death of the church's influence over its younger parishioners, while the old people just drop away:

... – white-whiskered, gaitered, booted and bonneted, ancient-tongued last of their world, who thee'd and thou'd both man and beast, called young girls 'damsels', young boys 'squires', old men 'masters', the Squire himself 'He' and who remembered the Birdlip stagecoach, Kicker Harris the old coachman...

Lee's own family breaks up as the girls are courted by young men arriving on motorcycles. This marks the end of Lee's rural idyll and his emergence into the wider world.

The girls were to marry; the Squire was dead; buses ran and the towns were nearer. We began to shrug off the valley and look more to the world, where pleasures were more anonymous and tasty. They were coming fast, and we were ready for them.

This is also the time when Laurie Lee experiences the first stirrings of poetry welling up inside him.

== Adaptations ==
Cider with Rosie was dramatised for television by the BBC on 25 December 1971, with Country Life later commenting that Hugh Whitemore's script was "rendered into a beguiling, sunny fantasy under Claude Whatham's softly focused direction." Music was by Wilfred Josephs, and Rosemary Leach was nominated for the British Academy Television Award for Best Actress for her roles as Lee's mother and as Helen in The Mosedale Horseshoe. Also in the 1970s, the book was turned into a stage play by James Roose-Evans. It was performed in the West End and later at the Theatre Royal, Bury St Edmunds, and at the Phoenix Arts Theatre, Leicester, with Greta Scacchi.

In 1998, not long after the death of Laurie Lee, Carlton Television made the film Cider with Rosie for the ITV network, with a screenplay by John Mortimer and with archive recordings of Laurie Lee's voice used as narration. The film starred Juliet Stevenson and was first broadcast on 27 December 1998.

The book was also adapted for BBC Radio 4 as a full cast radio drama in 1999 starring Tim McInnerny. Another radio dramatization was released by the same network in 2010. There was a second BBC Television production for BBC One, directed by Philippa Lowthorpe, with Samantha Morton as Annie Lee, Timothy Spall as the voice of Laurie Lee, and Annette Crosbie in the cast, which aired on 27 September 2015.

== Allusions ==
A racehorse was registered with the name Cider with Rosie in 1968 and won some races in the 1970s, including the Cesarewitch of 1972.

== Sources ==
- Cider with Rosie, Laurie Lee, Penguin Books, 1959, ISBN 0-14-001682-1
- Cider with Rosie, Laurie Lee, The Hogarth Press, 1959
- Cider with Rosie, Laurie Lee, David R. Godine, Publisher, 2008, ISBN 978-1-56792-355-1
