= Laurie Lee =

English writer (1914–1997)

Laurie Lee MBE
- Lee in 1960s
- Born: Laurence Edward Alan Lee; 26 June 1914; Stroud, Gloucestershire, England
- Died: 13 May 1997 (aged 82); Slad, Gloucestershire, England
- Resting place: Slad churchyard
- Occupations: Author, screenwriter, poet
- Spouse: Katherine Francesca Lee
- Children: 2
- Relatives: Jack Lee (brother)
- Writing career
- Language: English
- Years active: 1934–1997
- Notable works: Cider with Rosie; As I Walked Out One Midsummer Morning; A Moment of War
- Notable awards: Member of the Most Excellent Order of the British Empire

Laurence Edward Alan Lee, MBE (26 June 1914 – 13 May 1997) was an English poet, novelist and screenwriter, who was brought up in the small village of Slad in Gloucestershire.

His most notable work is the autobiographical trilogy Cider with Rosie (1959), As I Walked Out One Midsummer Morning (1969), and A Moment of War (1991). The first volume recounts his childhood in the Slad Valley. The second deals with his leaving home for London and his first visit to Spain in 1935, and the third with his return to Spain in December 1937 to join the Republican International Brigades.

== Early life and works ==
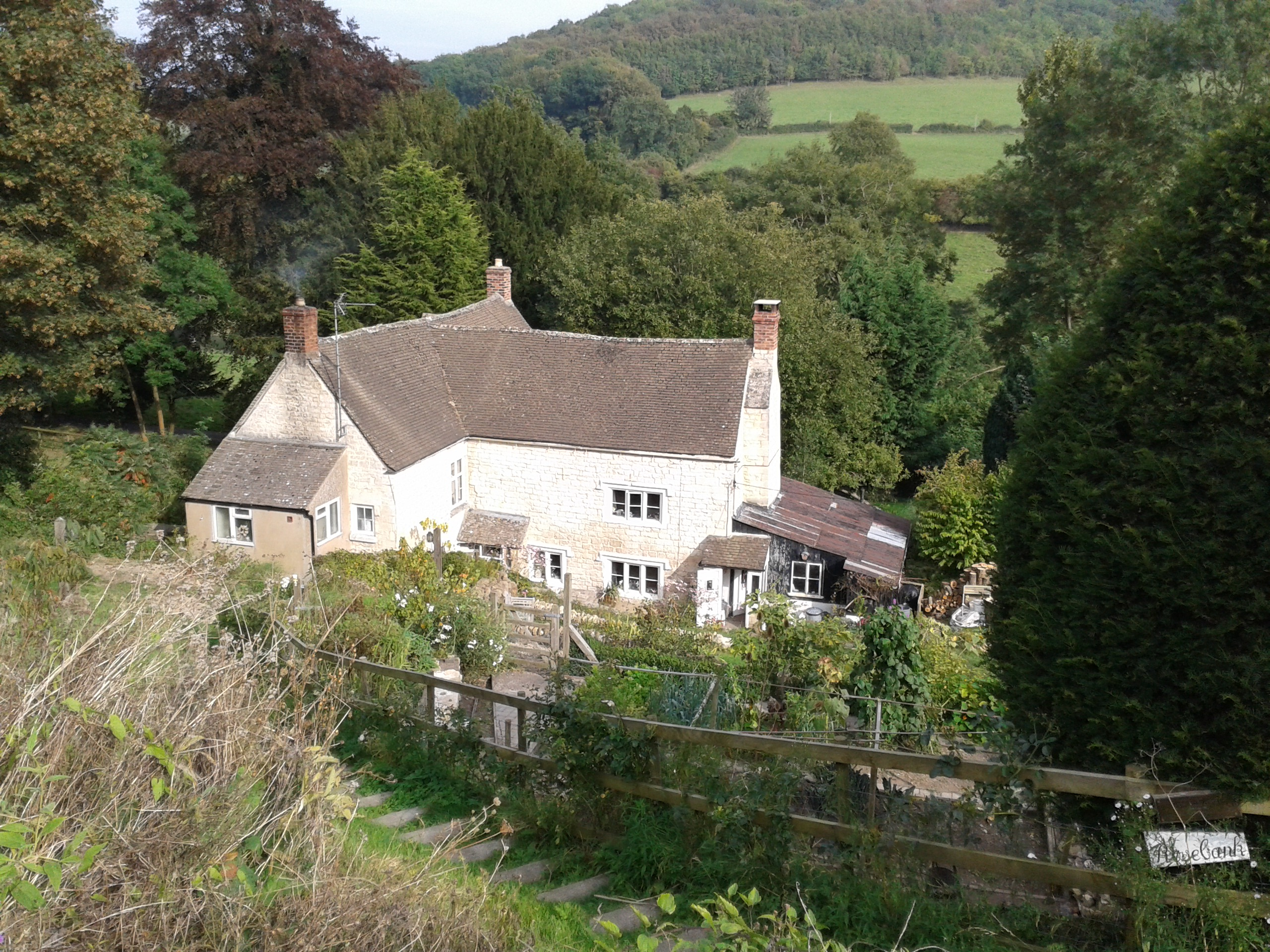
Laurie Lee's childhood home, Bank Cottages (now Rosebank Cottage), in the village of Slad.

Lee was born in Stroud, Gloucestershire on 26 June 1914, son of civil servant Reginald Joseph Lee (1877-1947) and Annie Emily (1879-1950), née Light, and moved with his family to the village of Slad in 1917; this relocation opens Lee's novel Cider with Rosie. After fighting in the First World War with the Royal West Kent Regiment, Lee's father did not return to the family. Lee and his brothers grew up close with their mother's family, but intensely disliking their Lee relations. His sister, Frances, died in 1915 aged three when Lee was a toddler. He had two full brothers, Jack and Tony, and five older half-siblings from his father's first marriage. His brother Jack (1913-2002) was to become a film director; although close when younger, they would fall out in later life, being "on non-speaking terms for 25 years".

At 12, Lee went to the Central Boys' School in Stroud. In his notebook for 1928, when he was 14, he listed "Concert and Dance Appointments", for at this time he was in demand to play his violin at dances.

Lee left the Central School at 15 to become an errand boy at a Chartered Accountants in Stroud. In 1931, he first found the Whiteway Colony, two miles from Slad, a colony founded by Tolstoyan anarchists. This gave him his first smattering of politicisation and was where he met the composer Benjamin Frankel and the "Cleo" who appears in As I Walked Out One Midsummer Morning. In 1933 he met Sophia Rogers, an "exotically pretty girl with dark curly hair" who had moved to Slad from Buenos Aires, an influence on Lee who said later in life that he only went to Spain because "a girl in Slad from Buenos Aires taught me a few words of Spanish."

At 20 Lee worked as an office clerk and a builder's labourer, and lived in London for a year before leaving for Vigo, in Galicia, northwest Spain, in the summer of 1935. From there he travelled across Spain as far as Almuñecar on the coast of Andalusia. Walking more often than not, he eked out a living by playing his violin. His first encounter with Spain is the subject of As I Walked Out One Midsummer Morning (1969). During this period he met a woman, Wilma Gregory, who supported him financially, and also met Mary Garman and Roy Campbell. After the outbreak of the Spanish Civil War in July 1936 Lee was picked up by HMS Blanche, a British destroyer from Gibraltar that was collecting marooned British subjects on the southern Spanish coast.

Lee started to study for an art degree but returned to Spain in 1937 as an International Brigade volunteer. His service in the Brigade was cut short by his epilepsy. These experiences were recounted in A Moment of War (1991), an austere memoir of his time as a volunteer in the Spanish Civil War (1936–1939). According to many biographical sources, Lee fought in the Republican army against Franco's Nationalists. After his death there were claims that Lee's involvement in the war was a fantasy; the claims were dismissed as "ludicrous" by his widow.

Lee met Mary Garman's married sister, Lorna Wishart, in Cornwall in 1937, and they had an affair lasting until she left him for Lucian Freud in 1943. Lee and Wishart had a daughter, Yasmin David, together. Wishart's husband Ernest agreed to raise the girl as his own; she later became an artist.

Before 1951 Lee worked primarily as a journalist and as a scriptwriter. During the Second World War he made documentary films for the GPO Film Unit (1939–40) and the Crown Film Unit (1941–1943). From 1944 to 1946 he worked as the Publications Editor for the Ministry of Information. In 1950 Lee married Catherine Francesca Polge, whose father was Provençal and whose mother was another of the Garman sisters, Helen; they had one daughter, Jessie. From 1950 to 1951 he was caption-writer-in-chief for the Festival of Britain, for which service he was made a Member of the Order of the British Empire in 1952.

The success of the autobiographical novel Cider with Rosie in 1959 allowed Lee to become a full-time independent writer. It continues to be one of the UK's most popular books, and is often used as a set English literature text for schoolchildren. The work depicts the hardships, pleasures and simplicity of rural life in the time of Lee's youth; readers continue to find the author's portrayal of his early life vivid and evocative. Lee said that the creation of the book took him two years, and that it was written three times. With the proceeds Lee was able to buy a cottage in Slad, the village of his childhood.

== Poetry ==
Lee's first love was always poetry, though he was only moderately successful as a poet. Lee's poems had appeared in the Gloucester Citizen and the Birmingham Post, and in October 1934 his poem 'Life' won a prize from, and publication in, the Sunday Referee, a national paper. Another poem was published in Cyril Connolly's Horizon magazine in 1940 and his first volume of poems, The Sun My Monument, was published in 1944. This was followed by The Bloom of Candles (1947) and My Many-coated Man (1955). Several poems written in the early 1940s reflect the atmosphere of the war, but also capture the beauty of the English countryside. The poem "Twelfth Night" from My Many-coated Man was set for unaccompanied mixed choir by American composer Samuel Barber in 1968.

== Other works ==
Other works include A Rose for Winter, about a trip he made to Andalusia 15 years after the civil war; Two Women (1983), a story of Lee's courtship of and marriage to Kathy, daughter of Helen Garman; The Firstborn (1964), about the birth and childhood of their daughter Jessy (christened Jesse); and I Can't Stay Long (1975), a collection of occasional writing.

Lee also wrote travel books, essays, radio plays and short stories. He wrote for British Transport Films Journey into Spring.

== Honours and awards ==
Lee received several awards, including the Atlantic Award (a Canadian literary award (1944), the Society of Authors travelling award (1951), the William Foyle Poetry Prize (1956) and the W. H. Smith and Son Award (1960).

In As I Walked Out One Midsummer Morning, Lee writes of his stay in Almuñécar, a Spanish fishing village which he calls "Castillo". In 1988 the citizens of Almuñécar erected a statue in Lee's honour.

In 1993, A Moment of War was chosen as a Notable Book of the Year by the editors of The New York Times Book Review.

Lee provided a great deal of valuable support to the Brotherhood of Ruralists in their attempts to establish themselves in the 1970s, and he continued to do so until his death; his essay Understanding the Ruralists opened the Brotherhood's major 1993 retrospective book. Indeed, it was Lee who is said to have given them the name "Ruralists."

In 2003 the British Library acquired Lee's original manuscripts, letters and diaries. The collection includes two unknown plays and drafts of Cider with Rosie, which reveal that early titles for the book were Cider with Poppy, Cider with Daisy, and The Abandoned Shade.

== Final years ==
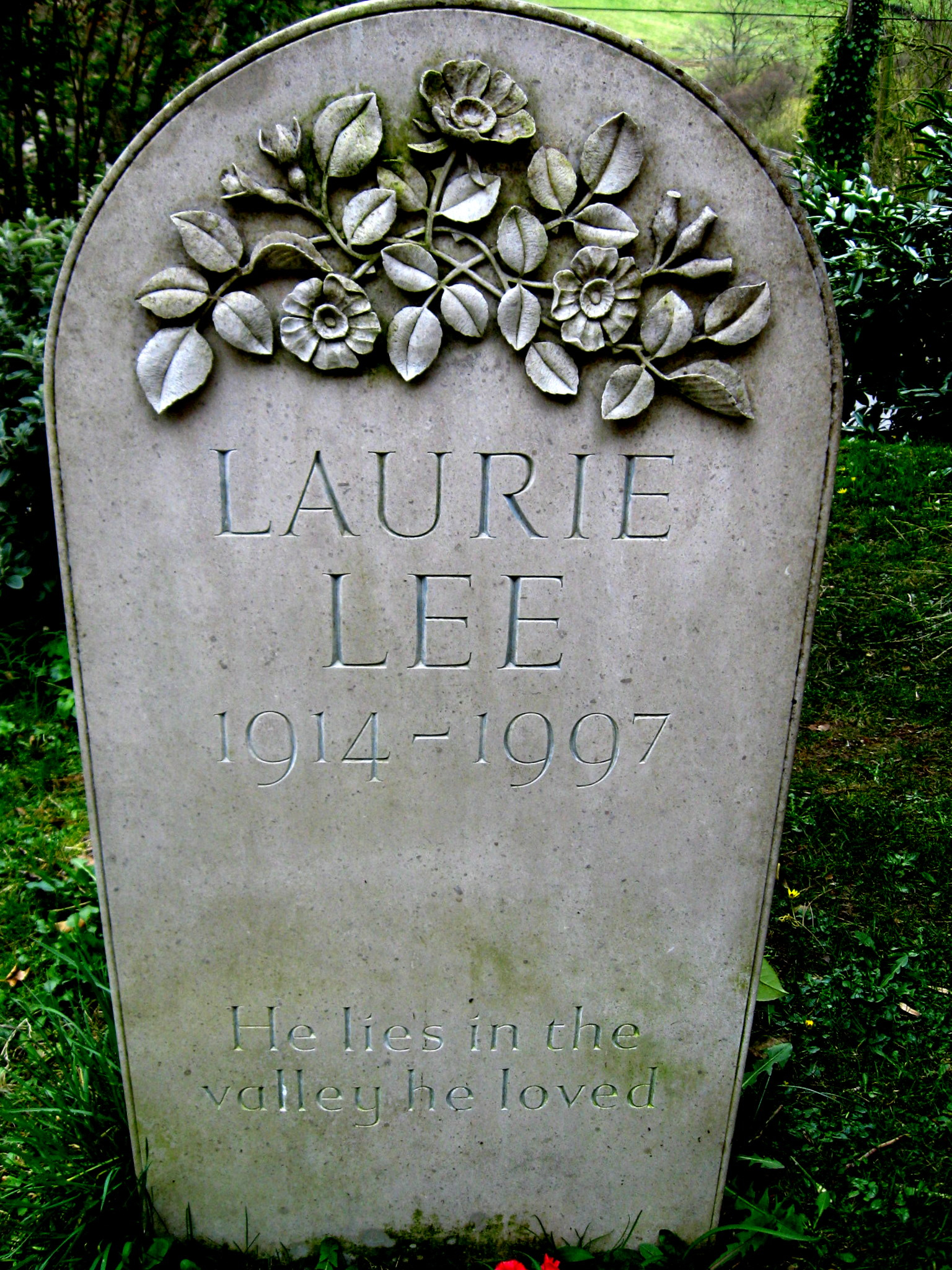
Laurie Lee's grave within the village churchyard. The inscription reads "He lies in the valley he loved"

In the 1960s, Lee and his wife returned to Slad to live near his childhood home, where they remained for the rest of his life, though for many years he retained a flat in Chelsea, coming to London to work during the week and returning to Slad at weekends. Lee revealed on the BBC1 Wogan show in 1985 that he was frequently asked by children visiting Slad as part of their O-Level study of Cider with Rosie "where Laurie Lee was buried", assuming that the author was dead.

An archive recording of Lee's voice was used for the narration of the Carlton Television film Cider with Rosie (1998), which was first broadcast after his death. The screenplay was written by his friend John Mortimer.

Lee died of bowel cancer at home in Slad on 13 May 1997, at the age of 82. He is buried in the local churchyard.

== Works ==
=== Books ===
- Land at War (1945)
- We Made a Film in Cyprus (1947), with Ralph Keene
- An Obstinate Exile (1951)
- A Rose for Winter: Travels in Andalusia (1955)
- Man Must Move: The Story of Transport (with David Lambert, 1960); published in the US as The Wonderful World of Transportation (1960) – for children
- The Firstborn (1964)
- I Can't Stay Long (1975)
- Innocence in the Mirror (1978)
- Two Women (1983)

==== Autobiographical Trilogy ====
- Cider with Rosie (1959); published in the US as The Edge of Day (1960)
- As I Walked Out One Midsummer Morning (1969)
- A Moment of War (1991)

=== Poetry ===
- The Sun My Monument (The Hogarth Press, 1944)
- The Bloom of Candles: Verse from a Poet's Year (John Lehmann, 1947)
- My Many-Coated Man (André Deutsch, 1955)
- The Pocket Poets Laurie Lee (1960)
- Selected Poems (Penguin Books, 1983)

=== Recordings ===
- Laurie Lee reading 'Cider with Rosie' complete and unabridged. ISIS audio books 1988. 7 disc set 7 h 55 min
- Laurie Lee Reading His Own Poems (1960), Decca music
- Cider with Rosie (3 LP disc set), 1977.

=== Plays ===
- Peasants' Priest (1947), performed at the Canterbury Festival.

==== Screenplays ====
- Cyprus Is an Island (1946)
- A Tale in a Teacup (1947)
- West of England (1951) (Board of Trade short, narrated by Stephen Murray)

==== Radio Plays ====
- The Voyage of Magellan (1946; published 1948)
- Black Saturday, Red Sunday (1956), produced by Louis MacNeice, BBC Third Programme.
- I Call Me Adam (1959), produced by Louis MacNeice, BBC Third Programme.

== Bibliography ==
- Grove, Valerie (1999), Laurie Lee: The Well-Loved Stranger, New York: Viking.
- Oliver-Jones, Stephen (2018), Laurie Lee 1914-1997 A Bibliography, Tolworth, Surrey: Grosvenor House Publishing Ltd
