= Environmental Liability Directive 2004 =

The Environmental Liability Directive 2004/35/EC is a European Union law Directive on enforcement of claims against occupational activities which damage the environment. Its objective is to create "a more uniform regime for the prevention and remediation of environmental damage" across the EU.

== Backgrounds ==
The Directive came into force across Europe during 2009 and in the UK it became law on 1 March 2009, converting the various national Pollution Prevention Guidelines (PPGs) such as the UK's Planning Policy Guidance Notes PPG11, PPG18 and PPG21 into requirements where failure to comply can result in fines and remediation or reinstatement costs.

Unlike the Seveso II Directive, Directive 96/82/EC, which applied to large high risk businesses, the Environmental Liability Directive applies to all businesses large and small alike. Two of the most important considerations within the Directive are the containment of spills (such as milk, cooking oil or diesel) and firewater, the runoff from fire fighting, which is likely to consist of water, foam and site-based materials. It can be deadly and have a major impact to the environment should it escape from your site. Hence, key in the Directive is an Environmental Management System [EMS] that to contain spills and firewater on their site for safe disposal later.

== Contents ==
Article 2 defines unlawful damage as in respect of "protected species" and "natural habitats", which in turn are defined by the Birds Directive and Habitats Directive.

Article 4 requires that "it is possible to establish a causal link between the damage and the activities of individual operators."

Articles 6 to 8 require that a polluter takes remedial action for any damage and pays the costs.

== Amendments ==
The ELD has been amended three times through Directive 2006/21/EC on the management of waste from extractive industries, through Directive 2009/31/EC on the geological storage of carbon dioxide, and through the Offshore Safety Directive 2013/30/EU, on safety of offshore oil and gas operations. The amendments broadened the scope of strict liability by adding the "management of extractive waste" and the "operation of storage sites pursuant to Directive 2009/31/EC" to the list of dangerous occupational activities in Annex III of the ELD.

== See also ==
- EU law
- Polluter pays principle
