= Slad =

Village in Gloucestershire, England

Coordinates: 51.766667°N 2.183333°W

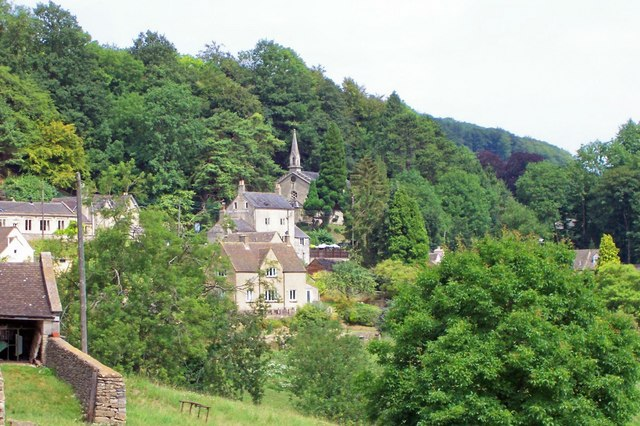
- Slad village, with Holy Trinity church in the background

- Location within Gloucestershire
- Population: 388 (2011 census)
- OS grid reference: SO873076
- Civil parish: Painswick
- District: Stroud
- Shire county: Gloucestershire
- Region: South West
- Country: England
- Sovereign state: United Kingdom
- Post town: STROUD
- Postcode district: GL6
- Dialling code: 01452
- Police: Gloucestershire
- Fire: Gloucestershire
- Ambulance: South Western
- UK Parliament: Stroud

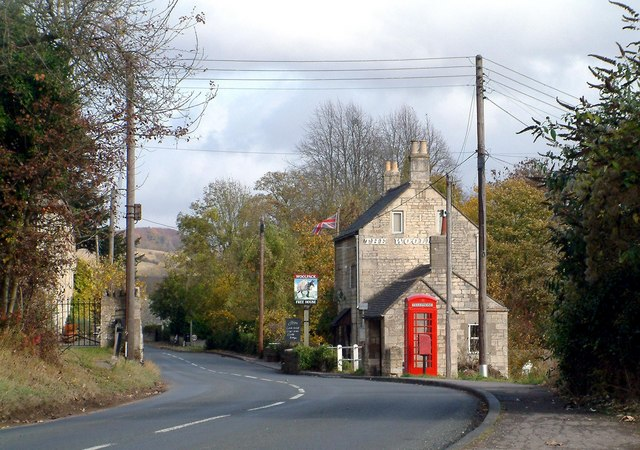
The Woolpack public house, 2004

Slad is a village in Gloucestershire, England, in the Slad Valley about 2 miles (3 km) from Stroud on the B4070 road from Stroud to Birdlip.

Slad was the home of Laurie Lee, whose novel Cider with Rosie (1959) is a description of growing up in the village from his arrival at the age of three in 1917.

== Locale ==
The Slad Brook runs along the bottom of the valley. The small parish church, Holy Trinity Church, is a Grade II listed building and there is also a small traditional pub, The Woolpack.

== Governance ==
Slad is in the civil parish of Painswick, in Stroud District, in the county of Gloucestershire and the parliamentary constituency of Stroud.

== People ==
Laurie Lee's novel Cider with Rosie (1959) is a description of growing up in the village from his arrival at the age of three in 1917. Having bought a cottage there with the proceeds from the book, he returned to live permanently in the village during the 1960s after being away for thirty years. Lee is buried in the village churchyard; the inscription on his headstone reads "He lies in the valley he loved".

Between 1970 and 1980 the poets Frances and Michael Horovitz lived at "Mullions", the end cottage of the settlement of Piedmont in an offshoot of the valley only accessible by foot from Slad. Frances' poetry from that period often refers to the surroundings there, as does Michael's Midsummer Morning Jog Log (1986). Horovitz's continued occasional residence is testified not simply by that poem but by his use of the cottage as the editorial address of his magazine New Departures into the 1990s.

Polly Higgins, FRSGS was a Scottish barrister, author, and environmental lobbyist, described by Jonathan Watts in her obituary in The Guardian as, "one of the most inspiring figures in the green movement". She left her career as a lawyer to focus on environmental advocacy, and unsuccessfully lobbied the United Nations Law Commission to recognise ecocide as an international crime. She died on 21 April 2019, at the age of 50 and is buried in Slad.
