= Portrait of Kitty =

Painting by Lucian Freud

- Artist: Lucian Freud
- Year: 1948-1949
- Type: Painting
- Medium: Oil on board
- Subject: Kitty Garman
- Dimensions: 32 cm × 24 cm (13 in × 9.4 in)
- Location: The New Art Gallery Walsall, Walsall
- Accession: 1973.096.GR
- Website: Portrait of Kitty at The New Art Gallery Walsall

Portrait of Kitty is a painting by Lucian Freud of Kitty Garman, his wife and the eldest daughter of the sculptor Jacob Epstein and Kathleen Garman. Completed between 1948 and 1949, this oil on board measures 35 by 24 centimetres (13.8 in × 9.4 in).

Freud (1922–2011) was married to Garman (1926–2011) between 1948 and 1952, and the couple had two daughters together, Annie (born 1948) and Annabel (born 1952).

== Model Kitty Garman ==
"Kitty" Garman was the eldest daughter of the sculptor Jacob Epstein and his lover Kathleen Garman. Epstein and Katherine Garman were together for over thirty years before they married in 1955, after the death of Epstein's first wife Margaret.

Epstein would visit Kitty's mother every evening between 6 and 7 pm, at which time no one else was allowed in the house.

Kitty studied at the Central School of Arts and Crafts under the tuition of Bernard Meninsky, but after she was introduced to Lucian Freud her own studies took a back seat. Freud had previously been the lover of Kitty's aunt, Lorna Wishart.

Their five-year relationship was turbulent. In 1952 Kitty left Freud and went to live with her parents.

== Portraits ==
Kitty has been the subject of many portraits, including Freud's famous Girl with a White Dog as well as drawings and sculptures by her father. More recently she was depicted in a BP Portrait Award winning triptych by the artist Andrew Tift.

Freud was known for his intense scrutiny of his subjects, revealing the intimate relationship between artist and sitter. Portrait of Kitty was one of several of his early works in which she acted as a model, and these are now generally regarded as some of his masterpieces. Kitty was known for her "wide-eyed feline features which captivated the artist", becoming his frequent model during the early years of their relationship. Most of Freud's sitters were not named, and in Freud's portraits of Garman she was often referred to as "Girl", with the exception being this portrait.

Utilising a prominent profile arrangement for the portrait, Freud depicts Garman in cool tones against a bare background of green shutters with areas of peeling paint. Typical of his early portraiture style, Freud paints Garman's hair and the subtle changes in the background with great attention to detail. According to art historian Sheila McGregor, the inclusion of aesthetically imperfect background elements "reveals his intention to depict the world with all its imperfections, bereft of symbolism or flattery."

Freud's painting style began to change in the 1950s, when he moved towards the much freer painting technique he is best known for.

== The New Art Gallery Walsall ==
Portrait of Kitty is in the Garman Ryan Collection at the New Art Gallery Walsall. This collection was gifted to Walsall in 1973 by Kitty's mother Kathleen Garman, and her friend Sally Ryan. Kathleen Garman had been brought up just outside the town and wanted to leave the works to Walsall to improve the cultural life of her native Black Country. Kathleen Garman purchased several works by her son-in-law which feature in the collection. Originally the collection was on display in a small gallery above the town's library. In the 1990s the idea of a new home for the collection was conceived, and in 2000 The New Art Gallery Walsall, a purpose-built gallery designed by the architects Caruso St John, opened to the public.

Kitty continued to draw and paint throughout her life and took an active interest in the gallery until her death in 2011. An exhibition of her work was held at the gallery in 2004.
