= Portrait of Elizabeth II (Freud) =

2001 painting by Lucian Freud

- Artist: Lucian Freud
- Year: 2001
- Medium: Oil on canvas
- Dimensions: 23.5 cm × 15.2 cm (9.3 in × 6.0 in)

Portrait of Elizabeth II, also known as Her Majesty the Queen or Queen Elizabeth II, is an oil portrait on canvas of Queen Elizabeth II by Lucian Freud. It was completed in 2001 and unveiled to a mixed reception. Following Elizabeth's death in 2022, the ownership of the painting is unclear.

== Description ==
The painting depicts Queen Elizabeth II wearing a blue day dress with "ropes of pearl" and the Diamond Diadem. She wore the diadem for the portrait at Freud's request.

Measuring only 23.5 cm × 15.2 cm (9.3 in × 6.0 in), the portrait depicts only Elizabeth's head and shoulders. Freud decided to include the Diamond Diadem after he had begun work on the portrait, requiring him to extend the canvas by 3.5 cm (1.4 in).

== Background ==
Elizabeth had previously appointed Freud a member of the Order of the Companions of Honour (CH) in 1983, and a member of the Order of Merit (OM) in 1993. In the mid-1990s Elizabeth's private secretary, Robert Fellowes, approached Freud to ask him to paint Elizabeth. Freud finally agreed in 1999. Freud had painted Fellowes in 1999, with the pair having become friends through the negotiations for Elizabeth's portrait. Freud later said that attempting to paint a face as recognisable as Elizabeth's was as challenging as "a polar expedition". He painted the portrait in the Friary Court picture conservation studio of the Royal Collection at St James's Palace. The sittings took place between Freud and Elizabeth between May 2000 and December 2001. Freud was known for requiring a large number of sittings for his subjects; the figure of 15 or 72 sittings has been quoted as being held between the pair. Upon the completion of the portrait Elizabeth told Freud that she had "very much enjoyed watching you mix your colours". Freud and Elizabeth spent a great deal of time talking about their mutual love of horse racing.

A photograph taken by Freud's assistant David Dawson, depicting Freud and Elizabeth during a sitting for the portrait, is in the collection of the National Portrait Gallery, London. It was given to the gallery as a gift by the art dealer John Morton Morris.

== Ownership ==
It was reported in 2001 that the painting would be part of the Royal Collection as a gift from Freud, but was subsequently revealed in 2022 to have been a gift from Freud personally to Elizabeth and remained her personal property. It is unclear whether the portrait became part of the Royal Collection or was inherited by her son King Charles III upon Elizabeth's death in 2022.

== Reception ==
BBC News wrote that the portrait had "divided both the press and art critics" and that Freud had "depicted the Queen with his characteristic naturalism". The BBC described Elizabeth as "[wearing] a severe expression, and her features are rendered heavily". Arthur Edwards, the royal photographer of The Sun, said that "they should hang it in the kharzi", and that Freud "should be locked in the Tower [of London]". Charles Saumarez Smith, the director of the National Portrait Gallery, described it as "thought-provoking and psychologically penetrating". Adrian Searle of The Guardian felt that it was the finest portrait of a royal for 150 years and that "Freud has got beneath the powder, and that itself is no mean feat ... Both sitter and painter have seen too much, are easily, stoically bored. They know the shape they're in ... This is a painting of experience." Richard Cork of The Times felt that it was "painful, brave, honest and stoical".

The Daily Telegraph regarded the portrait as "thought provoking" and "every bit as good" as previous portraits of Elizabeth, but felt it was "extremely unflattering".

Richard Morrison felt that Elizabeth's expression was of a sovereign "who has endured not one annus horribilis but an entire reign of them. The Merry Monarch it isn't", and that her chin "has what can only be described as a six-o'clock shadow, and the neck would not disgrace a rugby prop forward". Roy Strong wrote that Freud was the only painter who was able to "disregard the baggage of the past" in his portrayal of Elizabeth. Strong felt it was a "hypnotic aberration" as it was not painted for public consumption like Pietro Annigoni's portraits of Elizabeth.

The portrait was lent by King Charles III to an exhibition at the National Portrait Gallery in 2022.
