= Garman Ryan Collection =

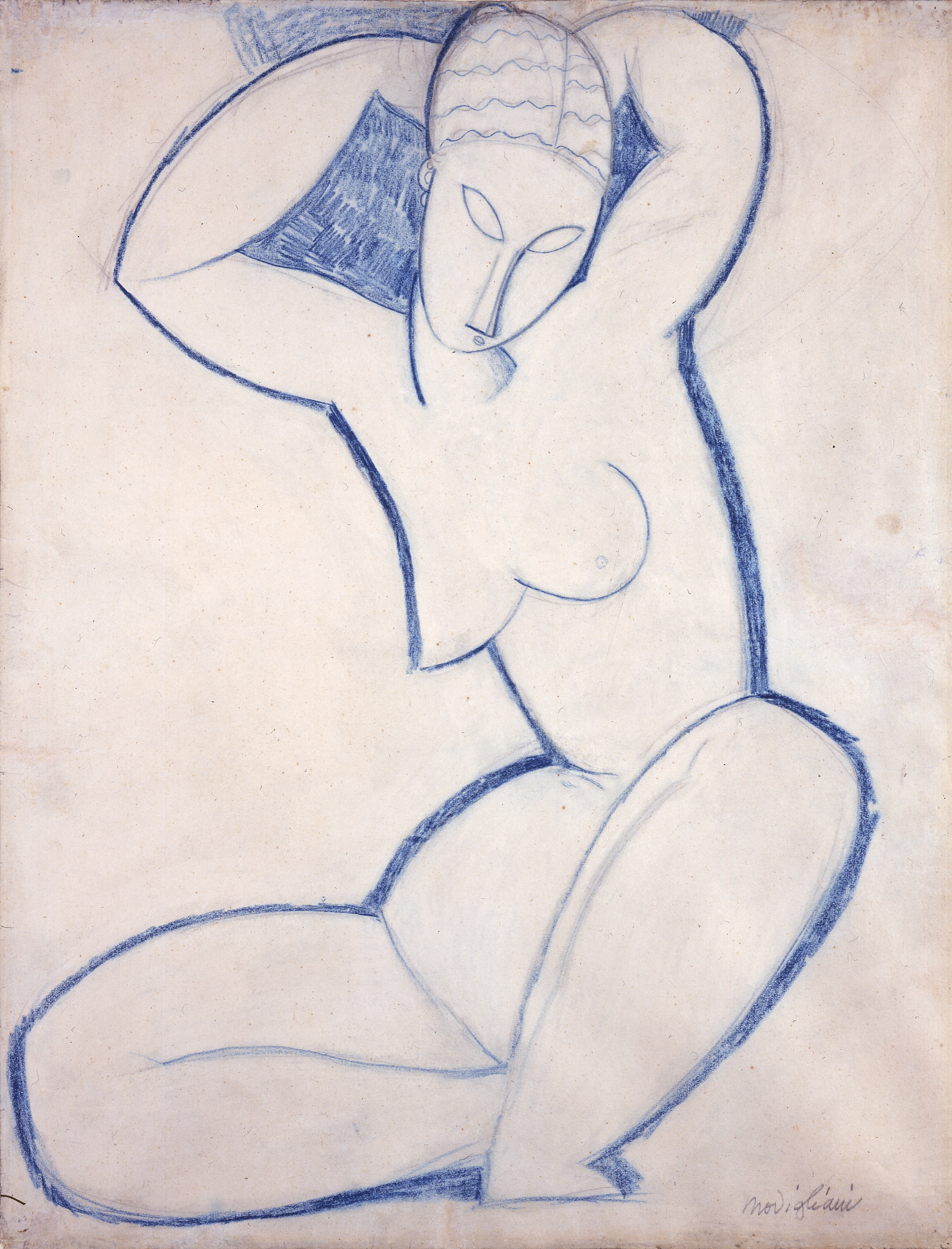
Amedeo Modigliani - Caryatid

The Garman Ryan Collection is a permanent collection of art works housed at The New Art Gallery Walsall and comprises 365 works of art, including prints, sketches, sculptures, drawings and paintings collected by Kathleen Garman (later wife of the sculptor Jacob Epstein) and lifelong friend Sally Ryan.

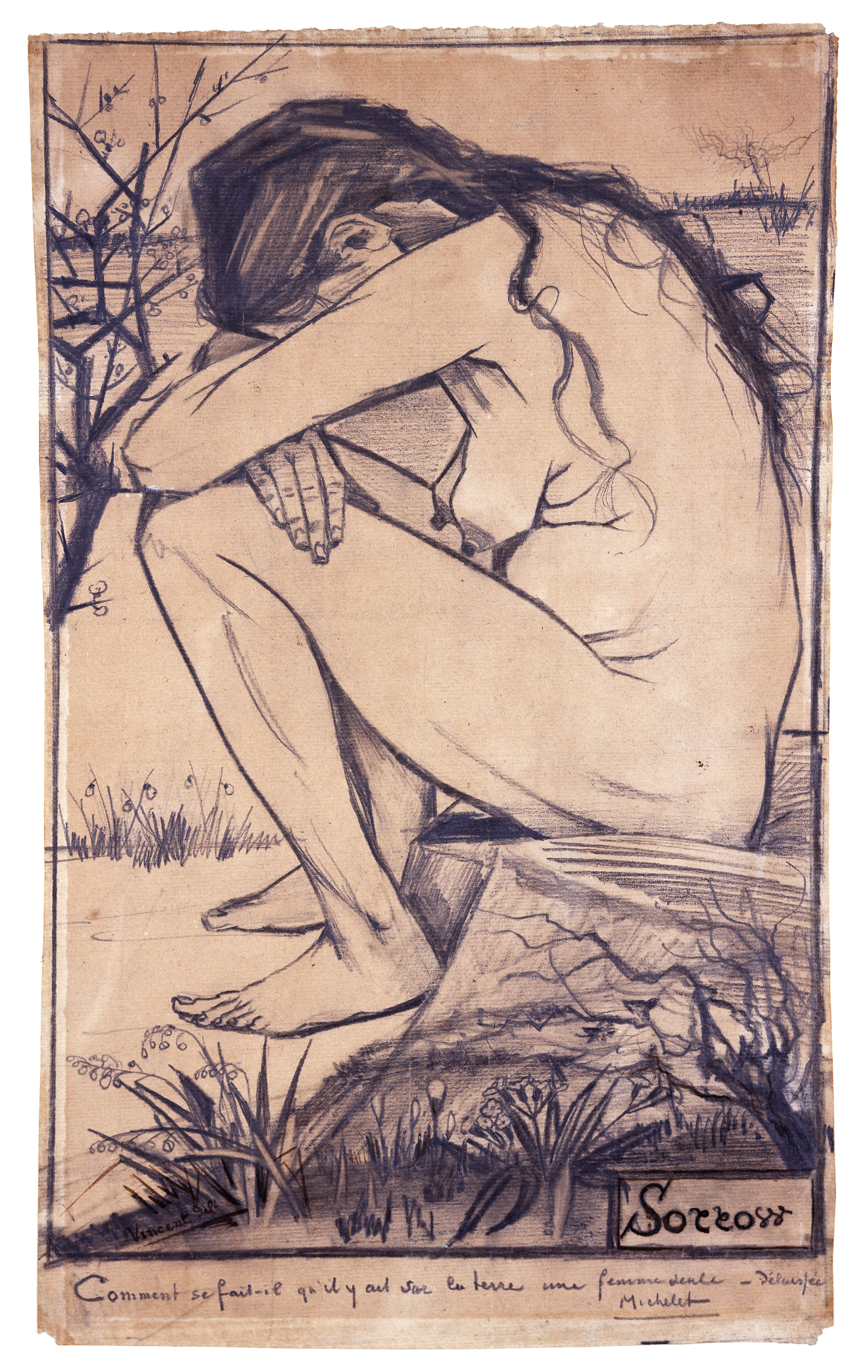
Vincent van Gogh - Sorrow

The Garman Ryan collection features many examples of works by key European artists of late 19th and early 20th Century, including Van Gogh, Picasso, Monet, Turner and Degas. There are a high number of works on paper within the collection and a number of sketches relating to major works by European artists, such as Delacroix's charcoal sketch of a New Born Lamb. It also includes a selection of sculpture, vessels and votive objects from cultures in Africa, Asia and South America. There are a significant number of works by Jacob Epstein within the collection. The collection contains the largest single holding of works by Jacob Epstein anywhere. Many of these works are bronze portrait busts, a mix of family members and commissioned portraits. There are also studies for key works, such as Study for Rock Drill.

== History of the collection ==
It is unclear at exactly what point Kathleen Garman and Sally Ryan conceived of making a collection of art. It has been suggested that the collection was, in part, in response to the death of Jacob Epstein (Kathleen's husband) whose work and own personal artefacts feature heavily within the collection. The Collection was largely assembled between 1959 and 1973.

Kathleen was the sole beneficiary of Epstein's estate upon his death, and although she sold much of his collection in accordance with his will, she retained a number of objects that were said to be of significance to her. Sally Ryan was able to fund the collection of artworks due to a large inheritance received from her grandfather Thomas Fortune Ryan, a successful American tobacco and transport magnate. A number of Sally Ryan's own works also form part of the Garman Ryan collection. Kathleen Garman also ran her own commercial art gallery, 'The Little Gallery', operating in Kensington, London in the mid-1960s, as a consequence she was buying and selling art on a regular basis. It has been suggested that a number of works from the Garman Ryan collection were originally 'Little Gallery' stock.

A number of artists represented with the collection also had personal connections with Kathleen Garman and Sally Ryan. Jacob Epstein was Kathleen's late husband, and artists Augustus John, Gaudier-Brzeska and Amedeo Modigliani were all friends. Family links are also evident within the collection; there are a number of works by Theodore Garman, the son of Kathleen Garman and Jacob Epstein, and Portrait of Kitty, a portrait of Epstein's daughter Kitty by her first husband Lucian Freud.

The collection was donated to the people of Walsall in 1973 and opened to the public in July 1974. It was originally exhibited in what was the first floor reference room of Walsall Library. The collection was moved to its new purpose-built home over two floors of The New Art Gallery Walsall, and opened to the public in this new setting in 2000.

== Themes ==
The Garman Ryan collection is exhibited thematically, as was the intention of Kathleen Garman. The themes are; "Children", "Work and Leisure", "Flowers and Still Life", "Religion", "Illustration and symbolism", "Figure studies", "Animals and Birds", "Trees", "Portraits" and "Landscapes".

== Key works ==
- Amedeo Modigliani – Caryatid
- Jacob Epstein – Study for Rock Drill
- Jacob Epstein – Bust of T. S. Eliot
- Vincent van Gogh – Sorrow
- Lucian Freud – Portrait of Kitty
- Claude Monet – The Sunken Road in the Cliff at Varengeville
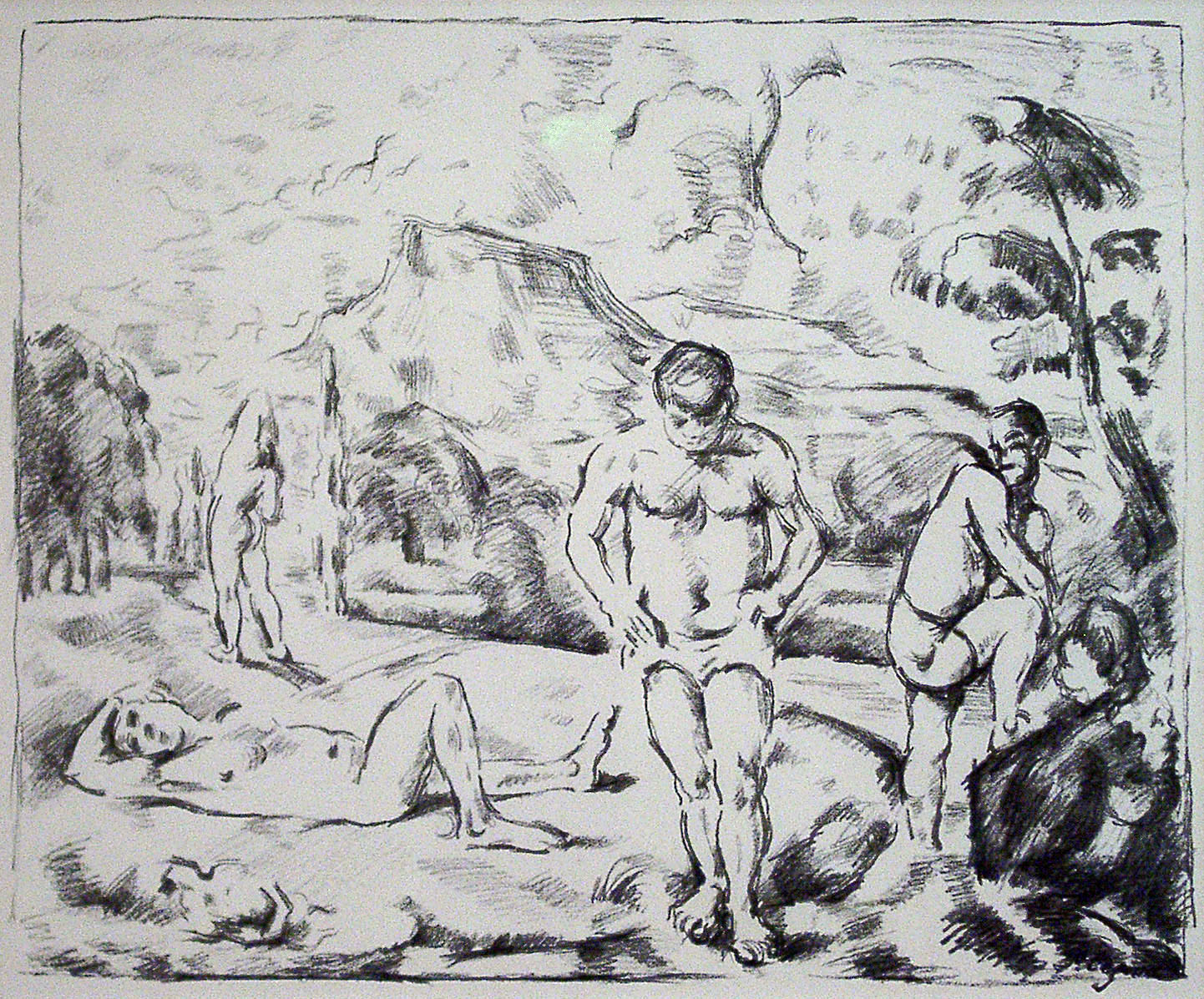
Paul Cézanne – Baigneurs (Grande planche)

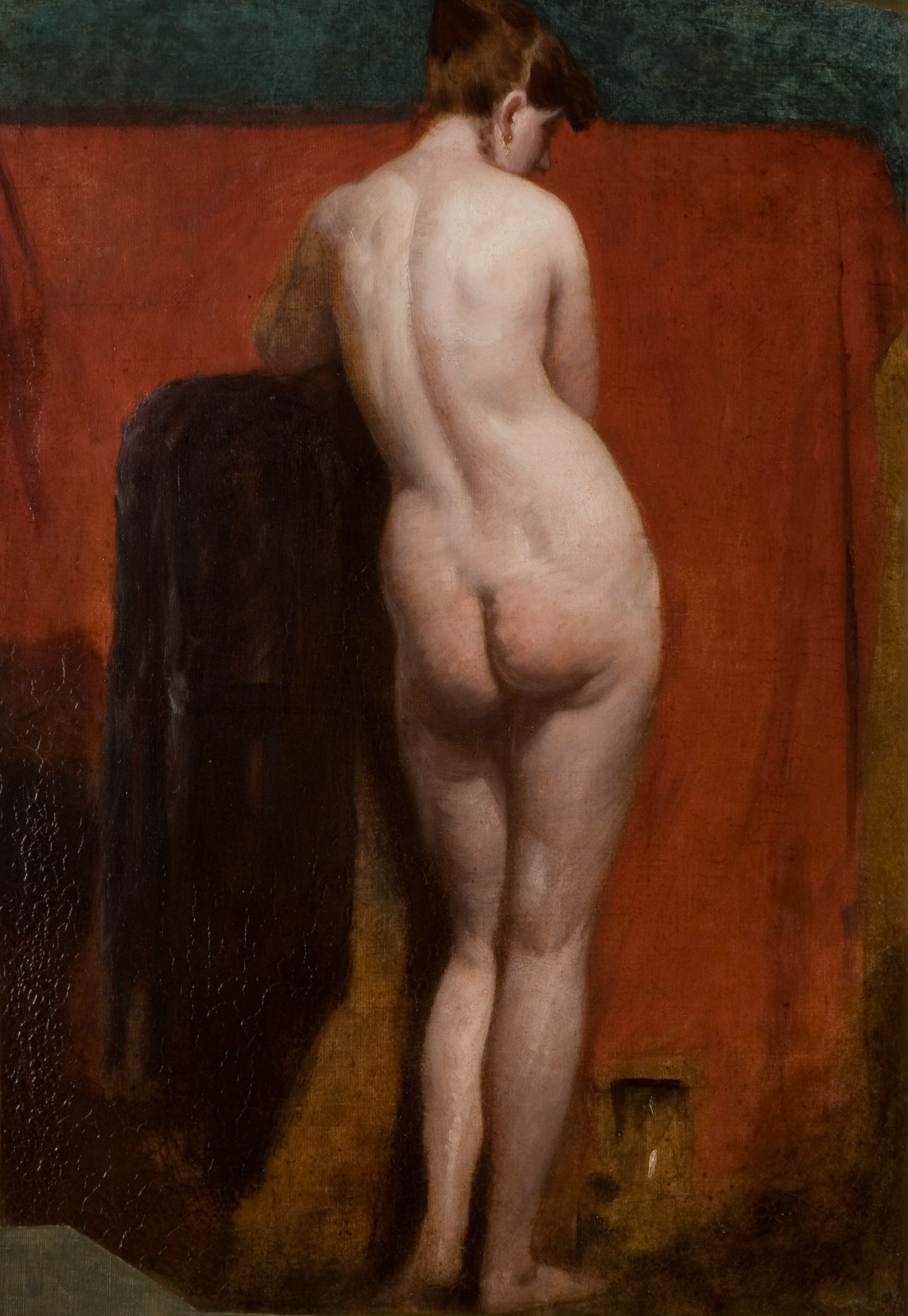
William Etty – Standing Female Nude

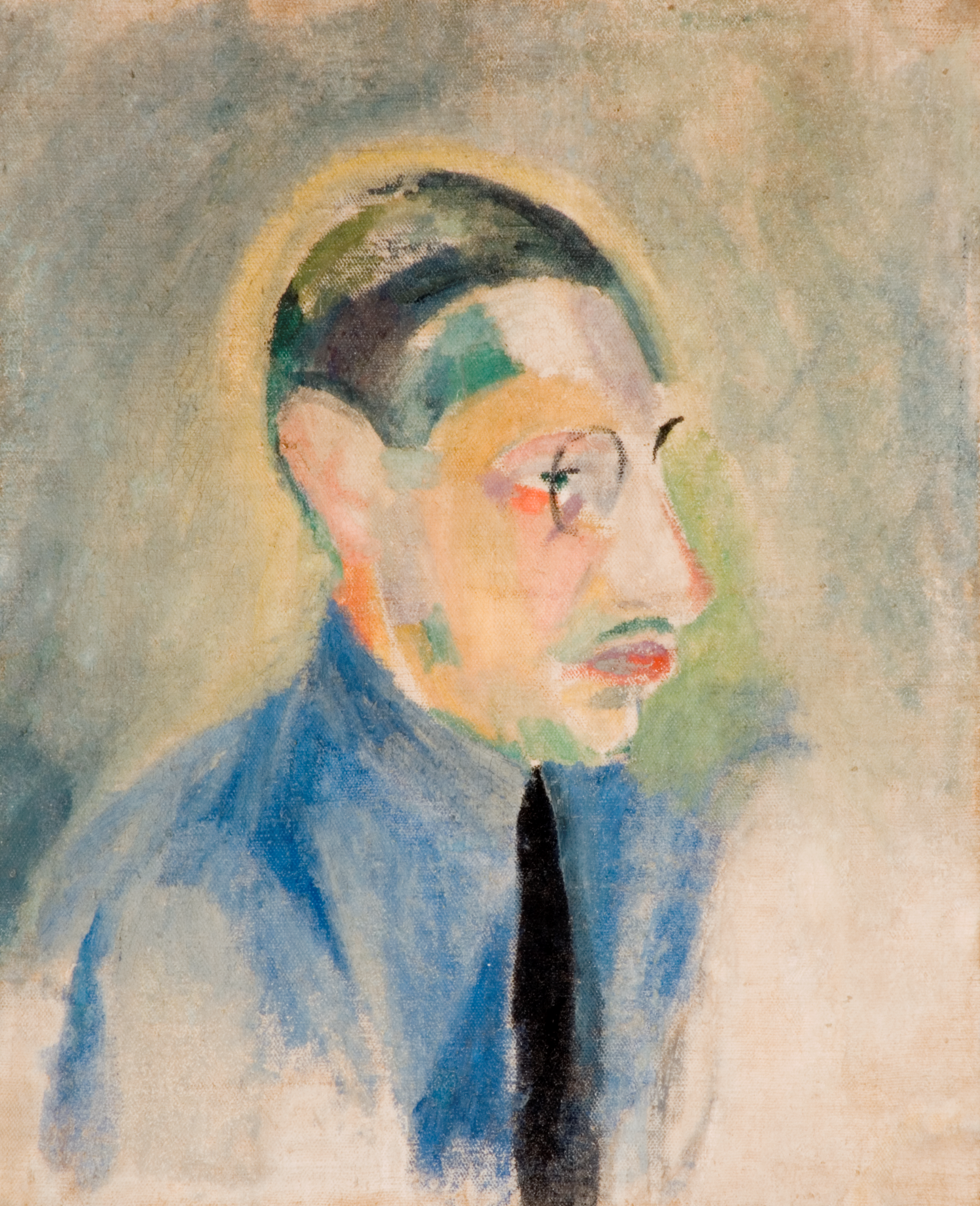
Robert Delaunay – Portrait of Stravinsky

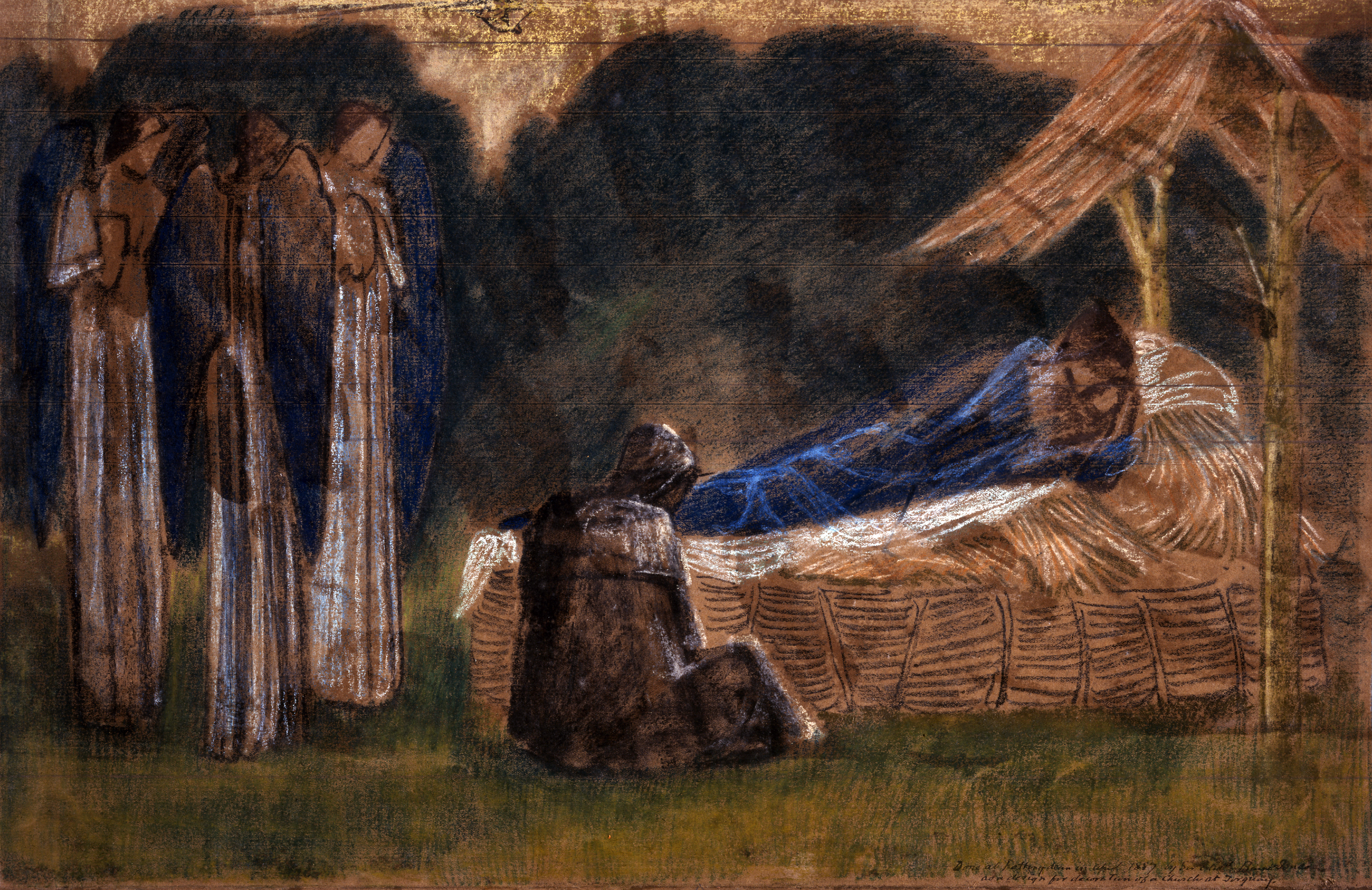
Edward Burne-Jones – The Nativity

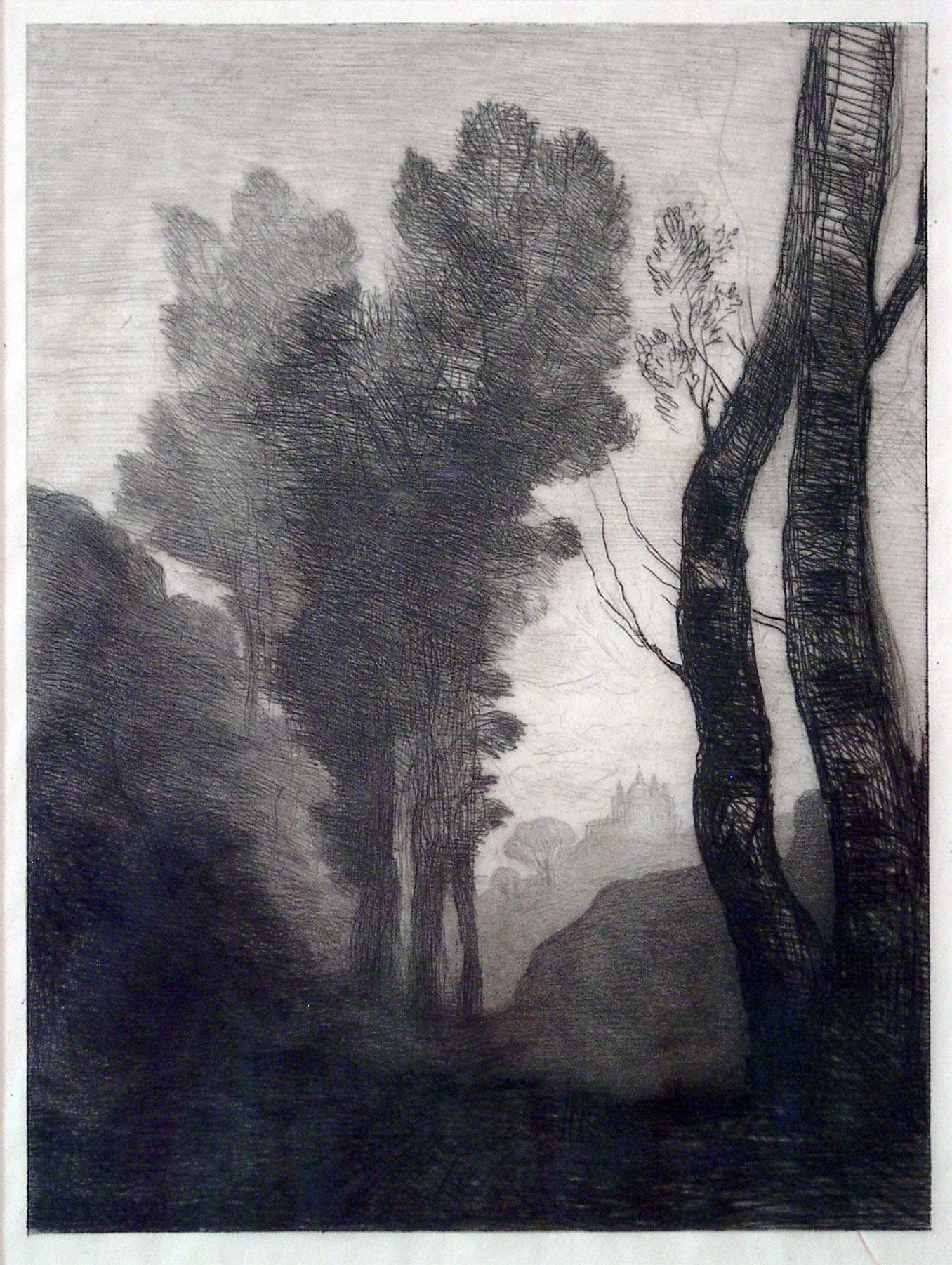
Jean-Baptiste-Camille Corot – The Outskirts of Rome

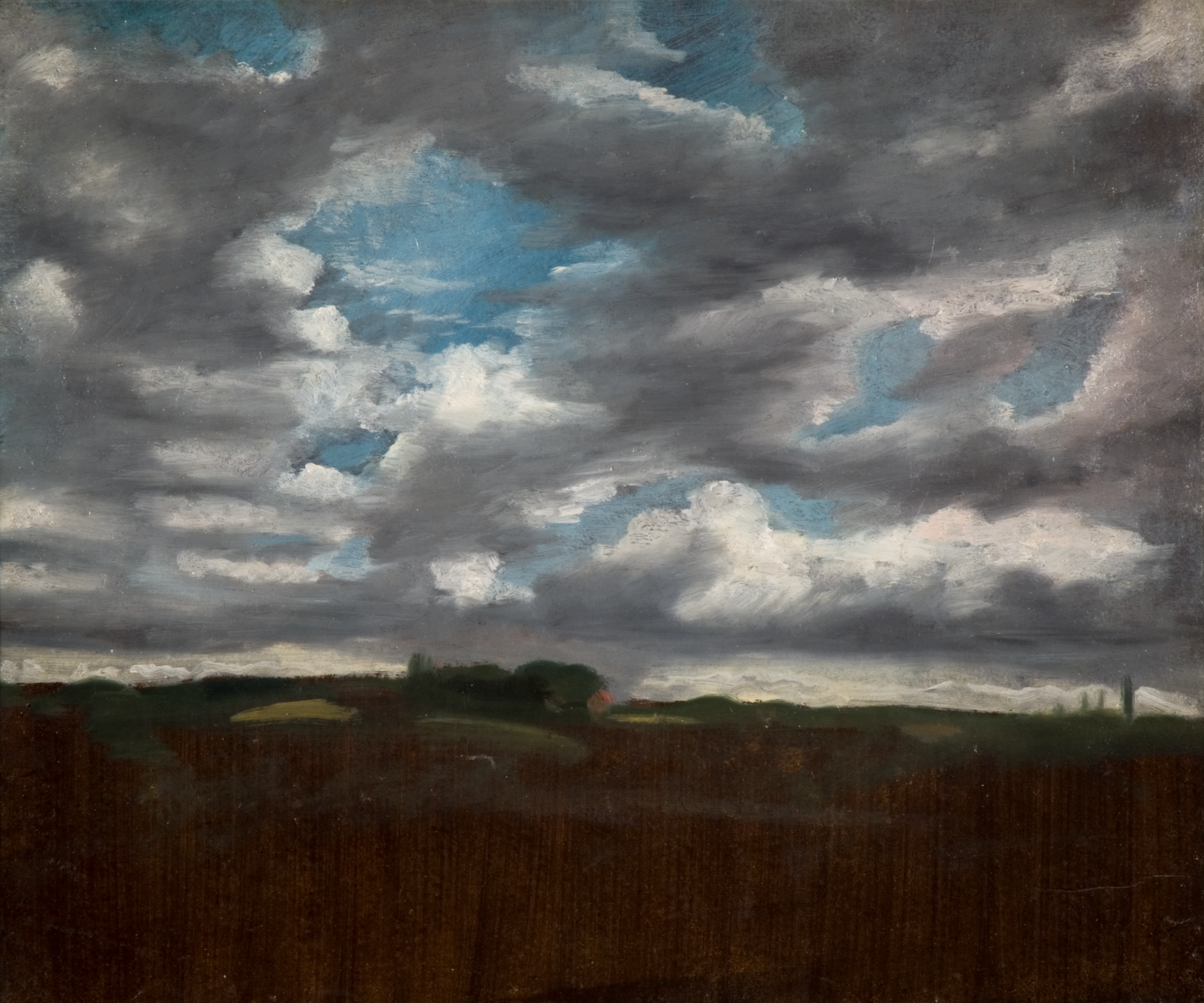
John Constable – Landscape with Clouds
