= Nayeri =

Nayeri (Persian: نیری) is an Iranian surname. Notable people with the surname include:

- Daniel Nayeri, Iranian-American writer
- Dina Nayeri (born 1979), Iranian-American novelist, essayist, memoirist, and short story writer
- Farah Nayeri, Iranian-born British author and journalist
