= Kitty Garman =

English artist (1926–2011)

- Kitty Garman
- Born: Kathleen Eleonora Epstein; 27 August 1926
- Died: 11 January 2011 (aged 84)
- Other names: later Kitty Epstein and Kitty Godley
- Education: Central School of Arts and Crafts
- Occupation: Painter
- Known for: Artist and muse
- Spouse(s): Lucian Freud; Wynne Godley
- Children: 3, including Annie Freud
- Parents: Jacob Epstein (father); Kathleen Garman (mother)
- Relatives: Theodore Garman (brother)

Kathleen Eleonora Garman (later Epstein and Godley; 27 August 1926 – 11 January 2011) was a British artist and muse. She was a model for her father Jacob Epstein, her first husband Lucian Freud (including Portrait of Kitty), and Andrew Tift. In 2004, she had her own show at The New Art Gallery Walsall.

== Life ==
Kitty Garman was born in 1926; her father was Jacob Epstein, the sculptor, and her mother was Kathleen Garman. The married Epstein would visit Kitty's mother in Chelsea between 6pm and 7pm each day. Her mother lived a Bohemian life that was considered unsuitable for bringing up her children. Kitty went to stay with her grandmother Margaret in Herefordshire, and her elder sister was also looked after. Her grandmother and her partner Toni Thomas became her bibliophile guardians and Margaret's daughters Lorna and Ruth were her role-models.

Her aunt Lorna left her first husband to have an affair with Laurie Lee and then with Lucian Freud. Lorna dumped Lee and eventually Freud as well because of his unfaithfulness with other women.

Kitty studied at the Central School of Arts and Crafts under the tuition of Bernard Meninsky and was taught book illustration by John Farleigh. Once she was introduced to Lucian Freud at the Café Royal her own artistic studies took a back seat. Freud had previously been the lover of Kitty's aunt, Lorna Wishart, who introduced Freud to her niece.

Their five-year relationship was turbulent, and became increasingly unstable due to Freud's alleged infidelities and womanising, which took their toll on Kitty's health. They had two children, Annie Freud in 1948 and Annabel Freud in 1952. The same year, Kitty left Freud and went to live with her parents after Freud started another affair with Lady Caroline Blackwood.

Her elder brother Theodore Garman was a talented painter who suffered from schizophrenia and died suddenly in 1954 at the age of 29; her younger sister Esther died by suicide in the same year. Her own parents eventually married in 1955, after the death of Epstein's first wife Margaret.

In 1955, Kitty married the musician and economist Wynne Godley. Her second husband had studied at the Paris Conservatoire and he became principal oboist at the BBC Welsh Orchestra, but his career was ended by his own stage-fright. Her father used her husband's "impossibly handsome" head as the model for his statue of St Michael at the rebuilt Coventry Cathedral. Wynne Godley would become a leading economist noted for his unheeded warning of global recession.

She and her husband had a child, Eve, in 1967.

Kitty continued to draw and paint throughout her life and took an active interest in the Walsall gallery until her death. An exhibition of her work was held at the gallery in 2004. She suffered from dementia in her last years and died in 2011.

== Portraits ==
Kitty has been the subject of many portraits, including Freud's Portrait of Kitty (1948–49) and the famous Girl with a White Dog (1950–51) as well as drawings and sculptures by her father. Much later, she was depicted in a BP Portrait Award winning triptych by the artist Andrew Tift which was in the National Portrait Gallery, London. The triptych is now at The New Art Gallery in Walsall.
