= Benefits Supervisor Sleeping =

1995 painting by Lucian Freud

- Artist: Lucian Freud
- Year: 1995
- Medium: Oil on canvas
- Dimensions: 151.3 cm × 219 cm (59.6 in × 86 in)
- Location: Private collection

Benefits Supervisor Sleeping is an oil on canvas painting by the British artist Lucian Freud, from 1995. It is held in a private collection.

== History and description ==
The depiction of a large, naked woman, lying on a couch. It is a portrait of Sue Tilley, a Jobcentre supervisor, who then weighed about 127 kilograms (280 lb). She is shown apparently sleeping in a couch, while holding with her hand one of her breasts. With her other hand, she is gripping the back of the couch, apparently to avoid falling off. Many sources reference her obesity.

Tilley is the author of a biography of the Australian performer Leigh Bowery titled Leigh Bowery, The Life and Times of an Icon. Tilley was introduced to Freud by Bowery, who was already modelling for him. Freud painted a number of large portraits of her around the period 1994–1996, and came to call her "Big Sue". He said of her body: "It's flesh without muscle and it has developed a different kind of texture through bearing such a weight-bearing thing." According to Tilley, Freud also was partial to the washed-out hues of her skin tone alongside the texture and shape of her body.

== Art market ==
The painting held the world record for the highest price paid for a painting by a living artist, when it was sold by Guy Naggar for US$33.6 million (£17.2 million) at Christie's, in New York, in May 2008, to Roman Abramovich.

Freud's painting The Brigadier broke this record when was it sold for £35.8 million ($56.2 million) in 2015, four years after his death, replacing Benefits Supervisor Sleeping as the most expensive Freud painting at auction.

== Exhibitions ==
The painting was exhibited twice at Flowers Gallery:

- 1996: Naked – Flowers East at London Fields
- 1997: British Figurative Art – Part 1: Painting at Flowers East
