= Theodore Garman =

English painter

- Born: 1 July 1924
- Died: 22 January 1954 (aged 29); London, United Kingdom
- Resting place: St Mary and St Gabriel, South Harting, Sussex, England
- Other name: Theo
- Occupation: Painter
- Parents: Kathleen Garman; Jacob Epstein
- Relatives: Kitty Garman (Sister)

Theodore Garman (1 July 1924 – 22 January 1954) was an English painter of the mid-20th century.

== Early life ==
Garman was born on 1 July 1924, the son of Kathleen Garman (then a "student of music") and Jacob Epstein. Kathleen was Epstein's mistress and later, after his first wife had died, his second wife.

Epstein lived apart from Kathleen, Theodore and his two younger sisters, but provided for them, although he was not named on Theo's birth certificate and never publicly acknowledged Theo as his son. At the age of six, Theo's portrait was painted by Epstein. It is now part of the Garman Ryan Collection at The New Art Gallery Walsall, along with three portraits of him in adulthood. Another portrait, also in the Garman Ryan Collection, was painted by Fritz Mühsan.

Garman was a gifted child and won school prizes for literature and history. A conscientious objector during the Second World War, he worked on a farm at South Harting, West Sussex near his grandmother's house. A friend from childhood, Kathleen Walne, said, "He was an eccentric, but a lovely one. He was a favourite in our household".

== Career ==
He developed as a talented painter. He was diagnosed with schizophrenia. (It was said on his death that he had "destroyed most of his canvasses in fits of depression".) In January 1950 he had an exhibition at the Redfern Gallery in London and in a foreword to the catalogue the artist and critic, Matthew Smith, wrote, "About the painting of Theodore Garman I can only say I look at them with wonder, admiration and even astonishment". Wyndham Lewis, in a review of the exhibition for The Listener, called him "an important newcomer". In March 1952 Theodore had a second exhibition at the Redfern Gallery.

On 22 January 1954, after an incident at the Chelsea School of Art in which he was accused of stealing a figurine to use in a still life, his mother tried to protect him by having him admitted to hospital. A struggle occurred in the ambulance and he had a heart attack and died before his thirtieth birthday. He was buried at St Mary and St Gabriel Church, South Harting, Sussex, which he had depicted in several paintings.

=== Works ===
One of the most popular paintings at The New Art Gallery Walsall, is his Summer Garden, South Harting (1944, oil on canvas, 66×76 cm). This shows the back garden of his grandmother's house. Visitors voted it their favourite painting in the collection. It is one of a collection of paintings by Theodore in the Garman Ryan Collection which his mother, who grew up in nearby Wednesbury, donated to Walsall. Other paintings by him in the collection include an early work, Stubbers Green Pool, Shelfield (c.1939, pastel; see Stubbers Green Bog) which shows a scene from Walsall which he visited with his mother to see her former nanny. Picture window in June (1951, oil on canvas 183x122 cm.) and The Wooden Monk (c. 1950s, oil on canvas, 127×102 cm.) are big pictures which bring together striking juxtapositions of mediaeval works of art and natural growth of flowers and leaves. Portraits of people from his life appear in the collection, such as Roland Joffe, a portrait of a young boy (c. 1950, pastel, 62×47 cm; see Roland Joffé).

His oil painting Autumn Chrysanthemums is at New College, University of Oxford.

== Legacy ==
A retrospective exhibition, Father and Son: Jacob Epstein (1880–1959) & Theodore Garman (1924–1954) was held at the Fine Art Society, London in October 1989.

His photographic portrait, by Ida Kar, is in the National Portrait Gallery.
