= Sue Tilley =

English artist's model and writer

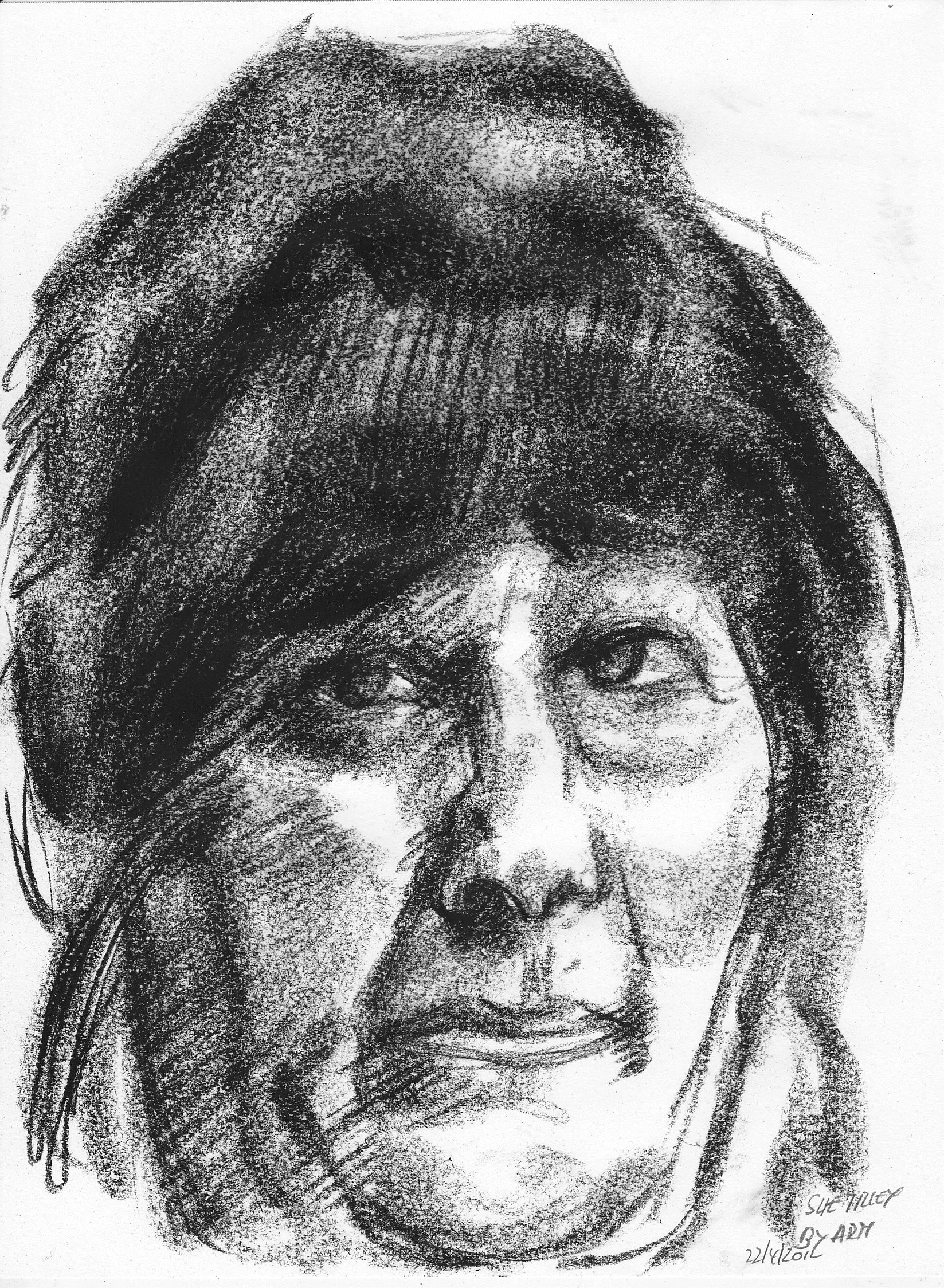
Charcoal on canson portrait of Tilley

Sue Tilley (born 1957), also known as Big Sue, is a British artist's model and writer. She modelled on several occasions for painter Lucian Freud.

== Biography ==
Born in south London, Tilley worked for performance artist and club promoter Leigh Bowery as a cashier at his "Taboo" night club. Bowery introduced her to Lucian Freud in 1990 and she began posing for him the following year, as a model paid a small fee. During this time, she was also a full-time benefits supervisor at the Charing Cross jobcentre, a state-operated employment agency, and she eventually became manager there.

Freud painted several large nude portraits of Tilley, the first being Evening in the Studio (1993). Benefits Supervisor Sleeping, painted in 1995, was sold at auction in 2008 for £17 million (US$33.6 million) in New York City. In 2015, the 1994 painting Benefits Supervisor Resting sold for £35 million ($56 million). A fourth painting, Sleeping by the Lion Carpet, was painted in 1996. Freud also produced a number of etchings depicting Tilley, some of which he gave to her, including Woman with an Arm Tattoo, which Tilley sold in 2005. Tilley never receive any payment other than her modelling fee. Tilley was friendly with Freud until he took offence at a remark she made and dropped her as a friend.

In 1997, she published Leigh Bowery: The life and times of an Icon, a biography.

From September 2000 to March 2001, Chief Curator Rolf Lauter at Museum für Moderne Kunst, in Frankfurt, organized the only overview exhibition of Freud's works in a German museum, in close cooperation with the artist. The catalog, the invitation, and the poster included Freud's painting Sleeping by the Lion Carpet from 1995/96 with Sue Tilley.

In 2015, she had a solo show of her own paintings and drawings in a London gallery. She collaborated with Fendi to decorate luxury clothes and bags with her pictures of desk lamps, bottle openers, banana skins, and cups of coffee.
