= The Nativity (Burne-Jones) =

Painting by Edward Burne-Jones

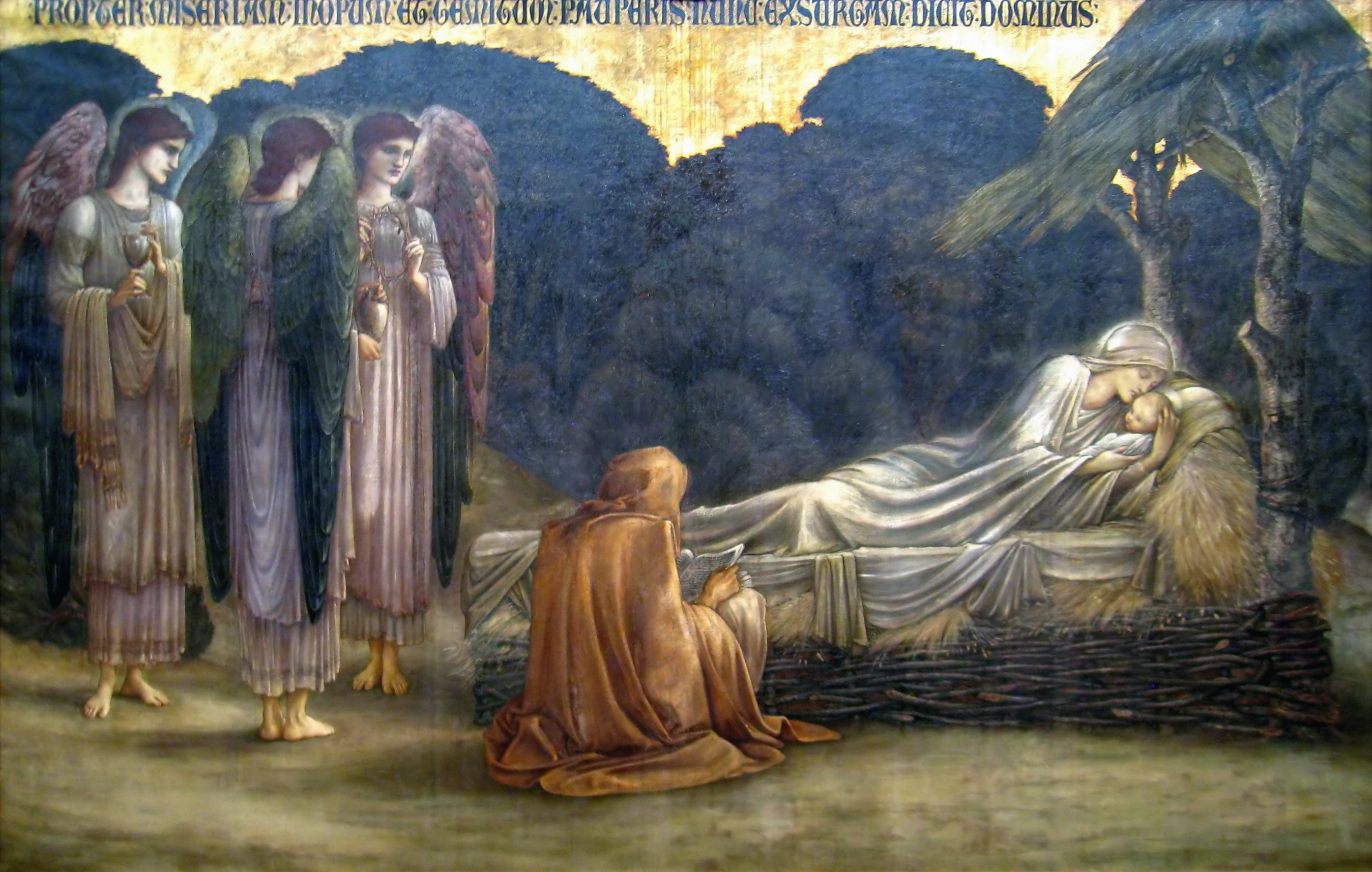
- Artist: Edward Burne-Jones
- Year: 1888
- Dimensions: 206 cm × 312 cm (81 in × 123 in)
- Location: Carnegie Museum of Art; Pittsburgh

The Nativity is one of a pair of monumental paintings by the Pre-Raphaelite artist Edward Burne-Jones commissioned for the chancel of the church of St John the Apostle, Torquay, England, in 1887. The Gothic Revival church was designed by architect George Edmund Street in the 1860s and decorated by Morris & Co., the decorative arts firm in which Burne-Jones was a partner.

St John's sold The Nativity and its companion painting, known as The King and the Shepherd, in 1989 to pay for a new roof for the church (copies were hung in their places). The two paintings were acquired for £1.5 million by composer Andrew Lloyd Webber, a collector of Victorian art. In 1997, Lloyd Webber donated the paintings to the Carnegie Museum of Art in Pittsburgh, United States, where his musical Jesus Christ Superstar had premiered in 1971.

== Description ==
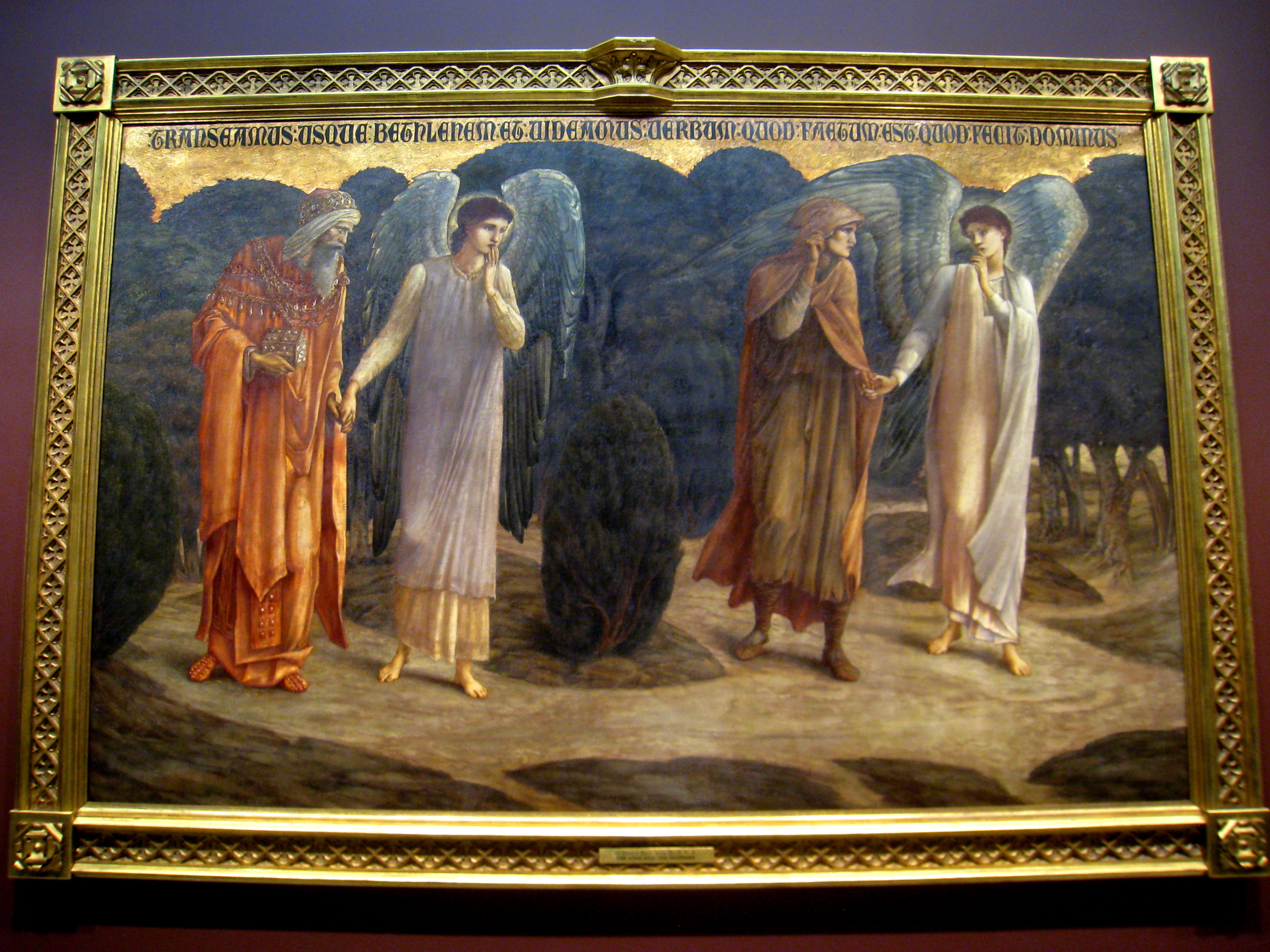
Companion painting The King and the Shepherd, 1888

In this treatment of the birth of Jesus, Burne-Jones places Mary reclining protectively around the infant Jesus while Joseph looks on. At the left are three angels bearing the symbols of the Passion and Crucifixion, the crown of thorns, a container of myrrh and a chalice. The painting bears an inscription in Latin from the Gallican Psalter (Psalm 11, verse 6) PROPTER MISERIAM INOPUM ET GEMITUM PAUPERIS NUNC EXSURGAM DICIT DOMINUS ["Because of the misery of the poor and the groaning of the needy, now will I arise, saith the Lord"].

== Studies ==
Several studies for The Nativity have survived. A pencil drawing sold at Sotheby's New York in 2012 places Joseph on the right, while an 1887 pastel sketch in the Garman-Ryan Collection at The New Art Gallery Walsall shows the final composition but a very different colour palette. The position of Mary and Jesus echoes Burne-Jones' design for a bronze relief of the Nativity of 1879. The relief was commissioned by George Howard, 9th Earl of Carlisle as part of a monument to his parents for Lanercost Priory, Cumbria. A drawing of this design is in the Fitzwilliam Museum.

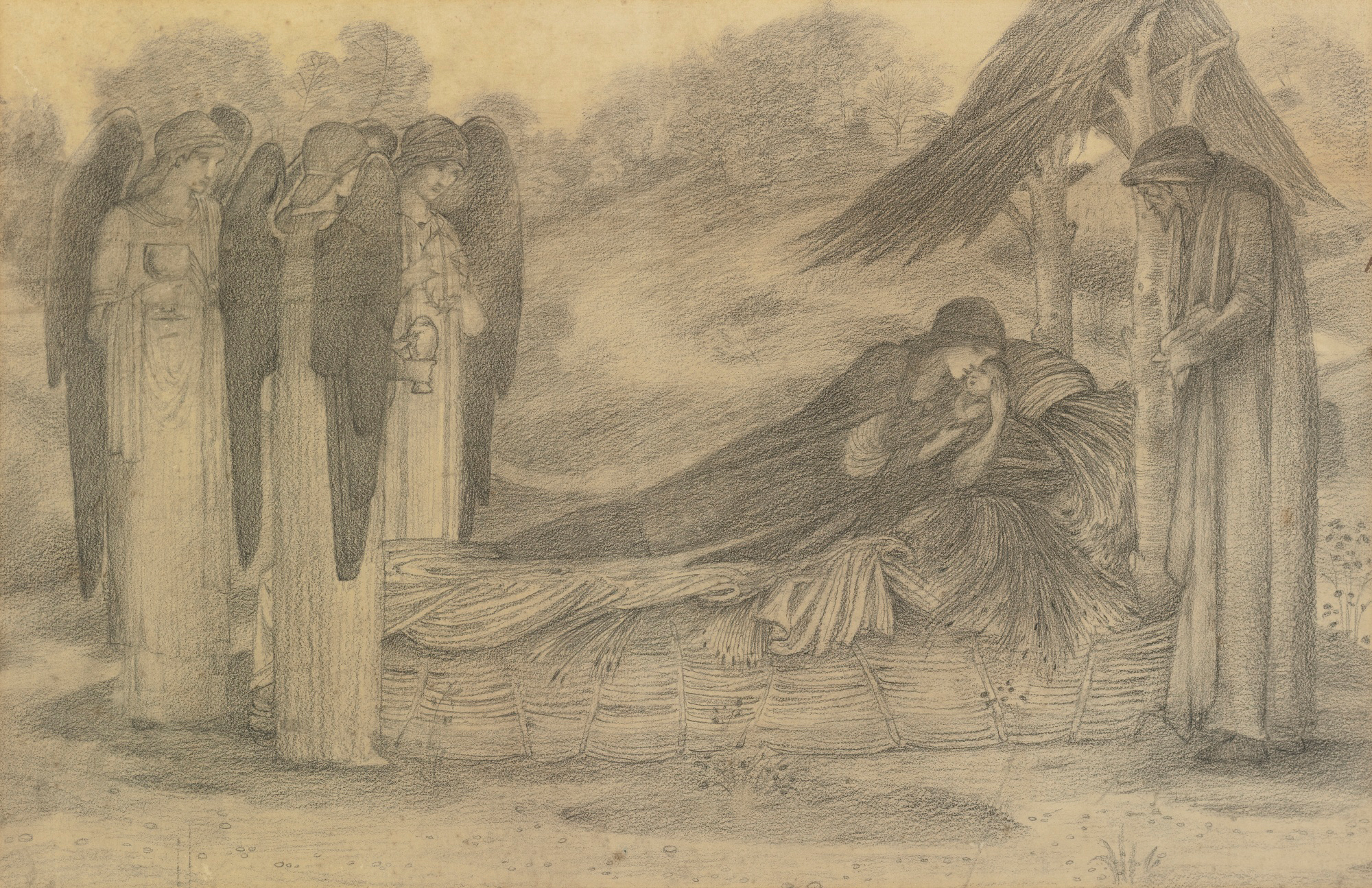
Pencil study for The Nativity

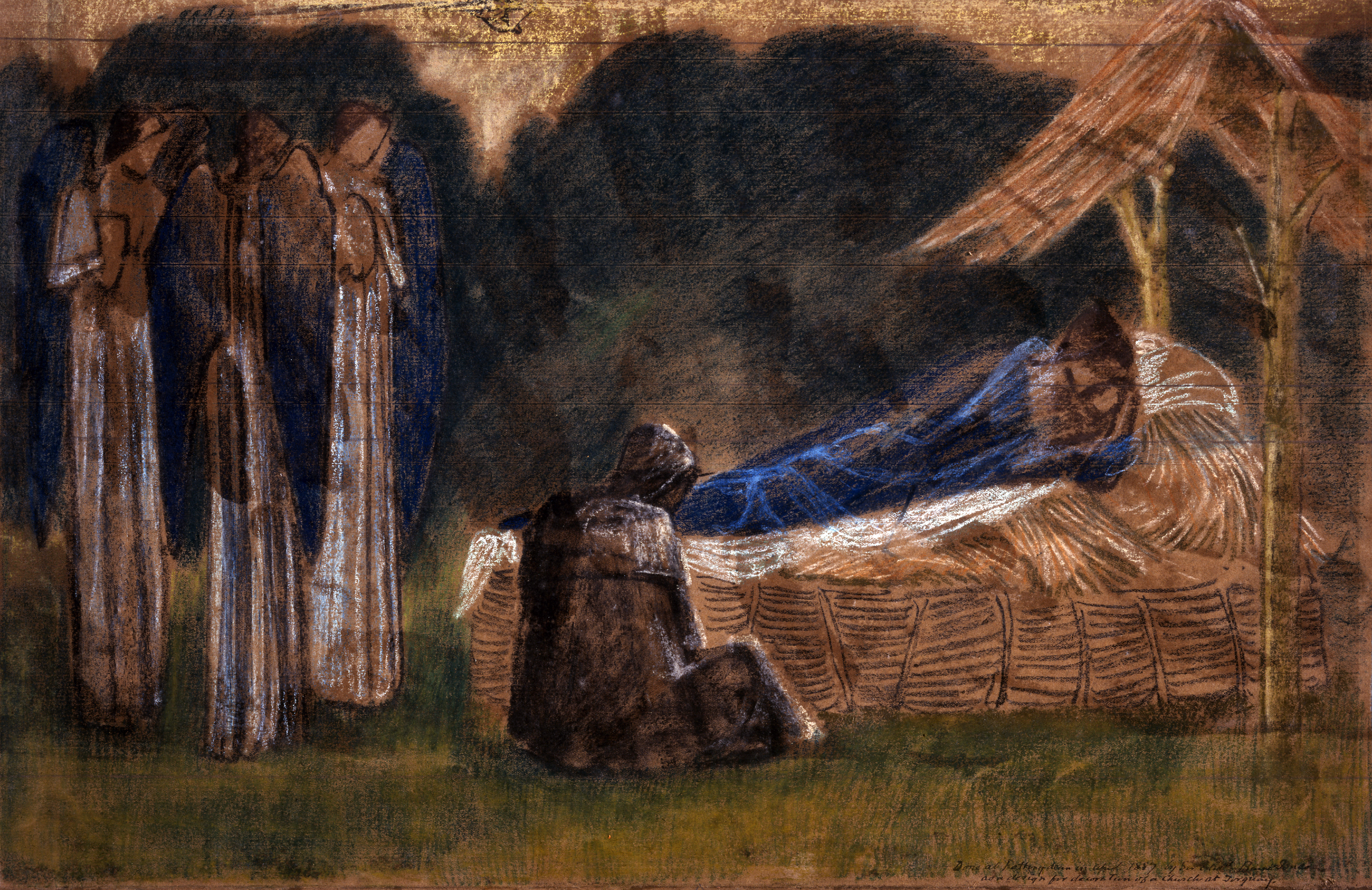
Pastel sketch for The Nativity, 1887 (Garman-Ryan Collection)

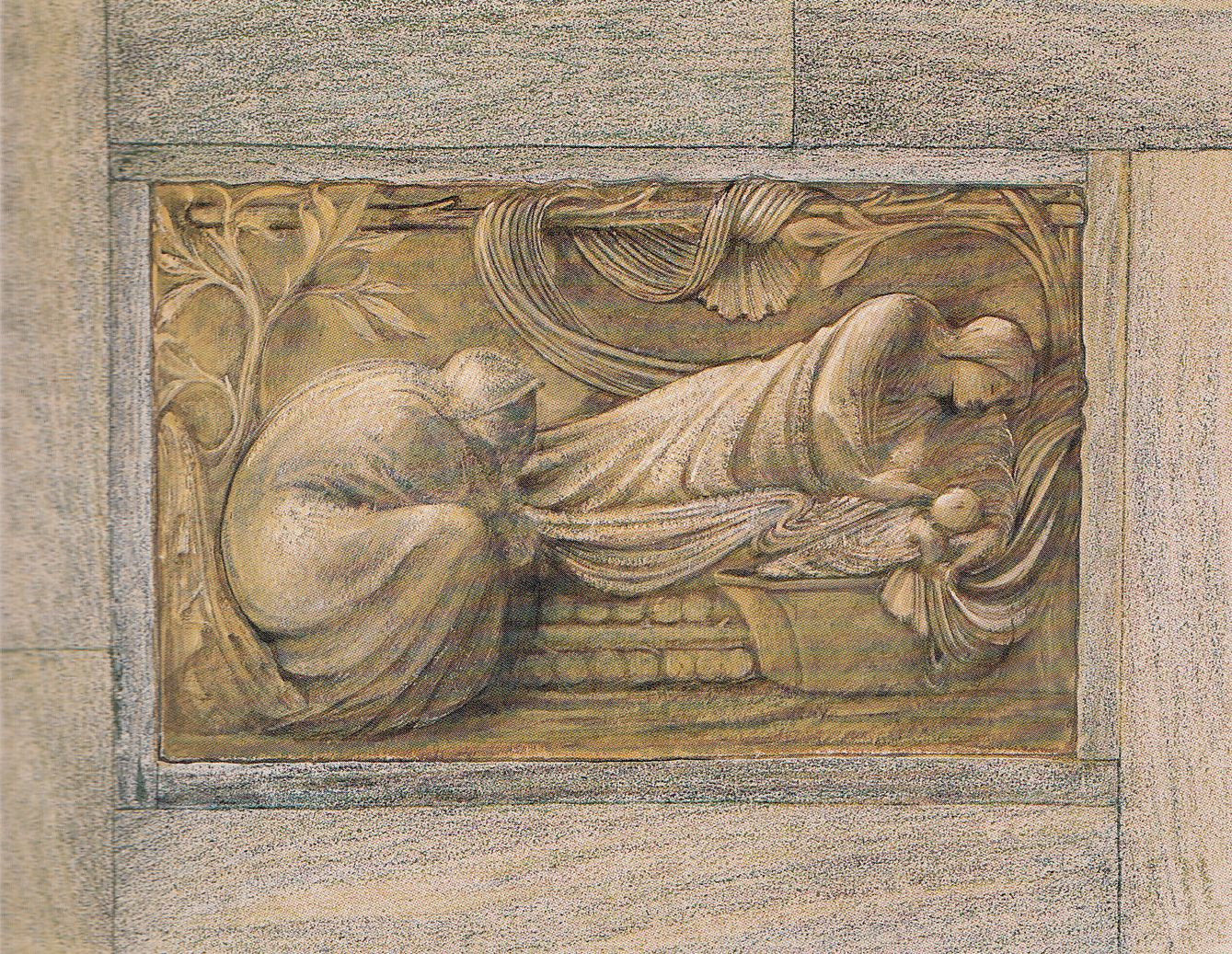
The Nativity, design for a bronze relief, 1879

== See also ==
- List of paintings by Edward Burne-Jones
