= Annie Freud =

English poet and artist (born 1948)

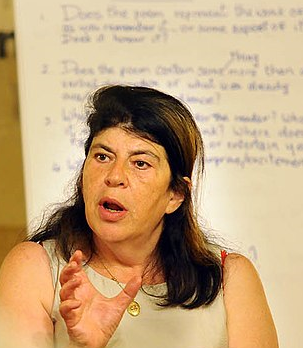
Freud speaking at the Biblioteca Central in Porto Alegre, 2011.

Annie Freud FRSL (born 1948) is an English poet and artist. She is the eldest child of the artist Lucian Freud and his first wife Kitty Garman. Earlier in her career, she was a civil servant. She was elected a Fellow of the Royal Society of Literature in 2024.

== Early life ==
Freud's childhood has been described as being bohemian and very much within her father's circle. In 1963, aged 14, she posed nude for one of her father's pictures. Lucian Freud's biographer, Geordie Greig, has written of this event that her father asked her to "remove her clothes and teenage inhibitions". This was, Grieg said, "a momentous and controversial event in Annie’s life. Many felt it was reprehensible, if not downright immoral. Lucian Freud did not care. The question of whether it would damage his daughter simply did not occur to him". Annie Freud later stated that the sitting had been a "wonderful time" for her and that the resulting work,—Naked Child Laughing—was "the picture of me by Dad that I most admire". (Note: This was not unusual; Lucian Freud asked six of his daughters, including Annie, and a son to pose naked for him on different occasions. On one such occasion, Annie Freud was pregnant.) On another occasion, however, she has been described as finding it an "unsettling experience", and one in which "It was all very well for Dad to say it was all right. No one else felt that it was." She posed for her father on other occasions—"11 or 12 times"—throughout her childhood.

== Art and poetry ==
I write my poems as little films. I see it as a visual thing, in front of my eyes, and that tells me what the poem might be about...a mixture of one nature with another. It made me feel those were things that mattered to me.

The first works of art she produced were on fabric and clothes, before moving on to board and paper. She was named by the Poetry Book Society as one of its Next Generation Poets for 2014 for her collection The Mirabelles; at 66 years old, Freud was the eldest contender.

The Arts Desk has described Freud as being "one of the very few" artists who are also poets, and vice versa. Freud's style of poetry has been described as "dramatic", "shocking" and "outspoken". Her first collection of poetry was published by Picador in 2006; two others were published by them subsequently.
