= Biblioteca Central Irmão José Otão =

Central Library Brother José Otão
- Biblioteca Central Irmão José Otão
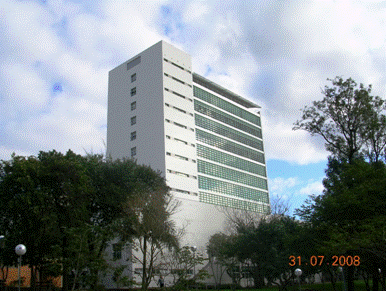
- 30.058565906685406°S 51.17306398096745°W
- Location: Porto Alegre, Brazil
- Type: academic library
- Established: 1940

Other information
- Website: biblioteca.pucrs.br

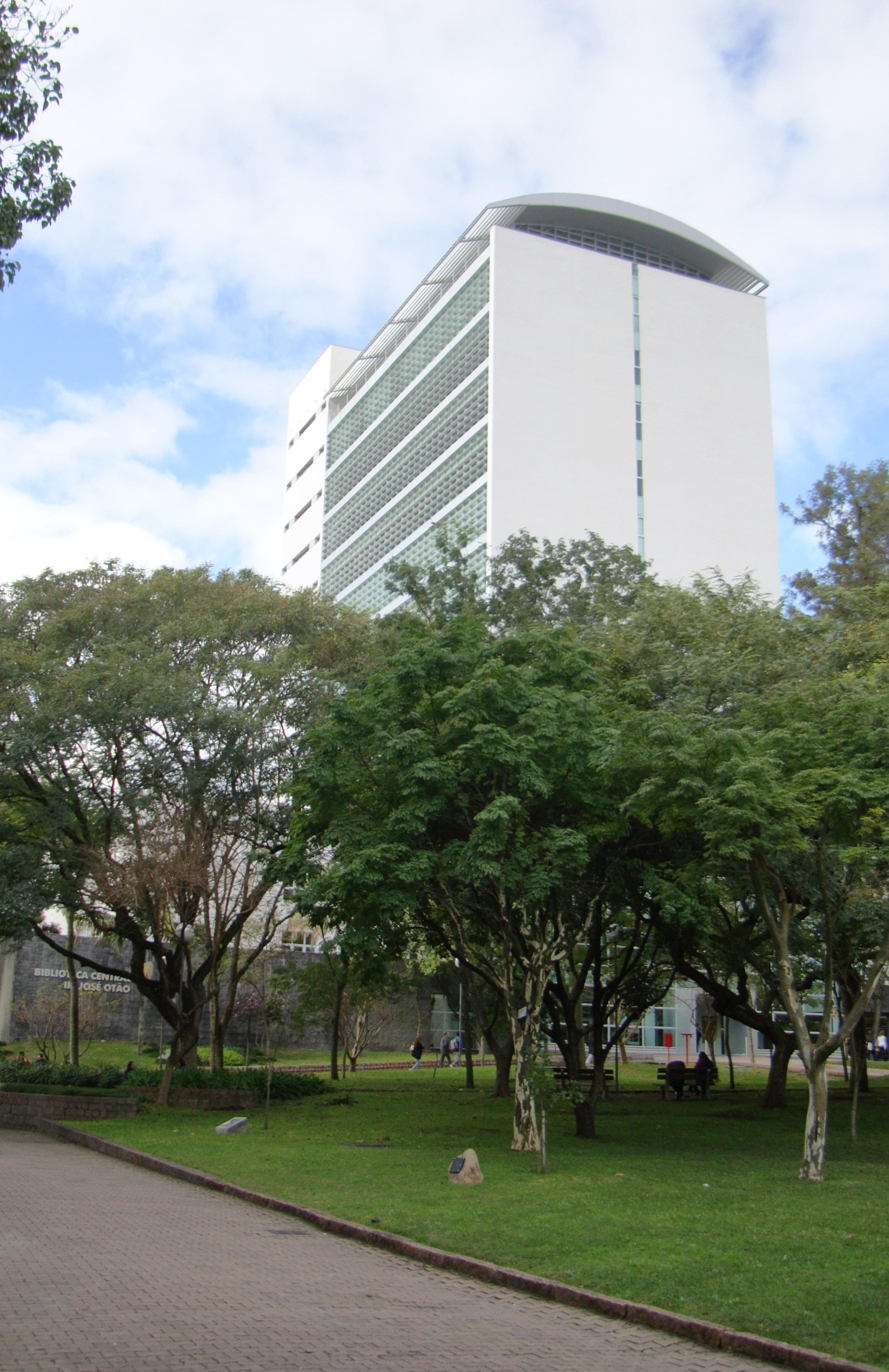
The Central Library Brother José Otão building

The Central Library Brother José Otão (Portuguese: Biblioteca Central Irmão José Otão) is the main library of Pontifícia Universidade Católica do Rio Grande do Sul (PUCRS), located in Porto Alegre, Brazil.

The Central Library had its origin in the collection located next to Rosário School in 1940, serving the Faculties of Economics, Philosophy, Social work and Law. In 1967, with the change to the current PUCRS Campus, it moved to the second floor of the rectory. In 1977, it moved to the current building, occupying a total area of 10,000 square meters. The physical space of the Central Library was expanded to an area of 21,000 square meters, through the integration of a tower of 14 floors to the old structure.

Academic research and knowledge production were significant increases of spaces equipped with microcomputers. In this sense, provides tables with 836 seats, 30 classrooms, a study room and outside decks provided exclusively for group study or individual. The Central Library serves the university community in the areas of education, research and extension, covering all areas of knowledge and contributing to their technical, scientific and personal, and some of their services offered also to the wider community.

== See also ==
- List of libraries in Brazil
