= Andrew Tift =

British painter (born 1968)

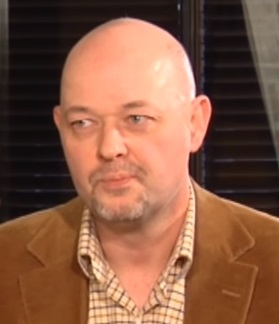
- Born: 1968 (age 57–58); Walsall, England
- Occupation: Painter

Andrew Tift (born 1968) is a British realist portraitist.

== Early life ==
Andrew Tift was born in 1968 in Walsall, England. He was educated at the Stafford College of Art. He then graduated from the University of Central England.

== Career ==
He is a realist portraitist. In 1998, he did a portrait of Tony Benn, a Labour Member of Parliament from 1950 to 2001. He also did a portrait of Glenys Kinnock, Baroness Kinnock of Holyhead, who served as a Labour Member of the European Parliament from 1994 to 2009. His portrait of Ken Livingstone, who served as the Labour Mayor of London from 2000 to 2008, has been exhibited at the National Portrait Gallery since 2014. He was also commissioned by the House of Lords to do a portrait of Peter Carington, 6th Baron Carrington.

He was the recipient of the BP Travel Award in 1995 for Sayonara Pet. In 2006, he received the BP Portrait Award for his triptych of Kitty Garman, Lucian Freud's first wife, entitled Kitty. The triptych is now at the New Art Gallery in Walsall.

== Personal life ==
He resides in the West Midlands.
