= David Dawson (painter) =

British artist (born 1960)

David Dawson (born 1960) is a British artist, born near Pwllheli, North Wales.

== Biography ==
He studied at Chelsea College of Art from 1984 to 1987, followed by the Royal College of Art from 1987 to 1989, where he was a contemporary of Tracey Emin and Jake and Dinos Chapman. Unlike them, however, even at this stage Dawson considered himself to be almost exclusively a painter.

In 1989, Dawson showed his works at Flowers Gallery. He was chosen for the 6th edition of Artist of the Day, a valuable platform for artists since 1983, by Joe Tilson. The exhibition showcased the work of ten artists, chosen not by the gallery, but by established professional practitioners who each nominated a talent of their choice.

After leaving the Royal College of Art he became an assistant to the artist Lucian Freud in 1991, whilst working for Freud's art dealer at the time James Kirkman, and he continued this role until Freud died, as well as being a frequent model for Freud's paintings.

Dawson exhibited his paintings at Marlborough Fine Art in London in a two-person show with Catherine Goodman in 2004, and in 2011 a private solo show at 61a Cadogan Square in London.

As well as being a painter, Dawson is also a photographer, with his most well known photographs being a series started in 2000 of Freud at work. These were shown at London's National Portrait Gallery in 2004, and 26 of them were acquired for the gallery's collection, including images of Freud painting David Hockney, visits to Freud's studio by Neil MacGregor and Frank Auerbach, and Freud painting Queen Elizabeth II. A number of Dawson's photographs of Freud also appeared in 2006 in the book Freud at Work.

Dawson is represented by Marlborough Fine Art in London.

== Style and influences ==
Dawson's paintings are realist in style and predominantly urban. His work has affinities with the School of London painters, including the paintings of Frank Auerbach, who is an acknowledged influence on him. However, there is a much clearer use of linear elements, with drawn structural lines often remaining evident in the finished paintings.

The urban subject matter could more accurately be described as 'suburban' as Dawson tends to concentrate on scenes from the area in which he lives, Kensal Rise in north London. He is quoted as saying, 'Looking out of the window is my starting point.' This approach has led to a series of paintings based on the cul-de-sac in which Dawson lives.

Although Dawson has acknowledged influence from abstract painters, including Jackson Pollock, his only works that are near abstract are a series of 'cloud paintings' depicting clouds against the sky. These were described by Dawson as being made to allow him to 'play with paint'. In his own estimation, however, he prefers to work from a physical subject, pushing it towards abstraction and then bringing it back towards realism.
