= Lucian Freud =

British painter and engraver (1922–2011)

Lucian Freud OM CH
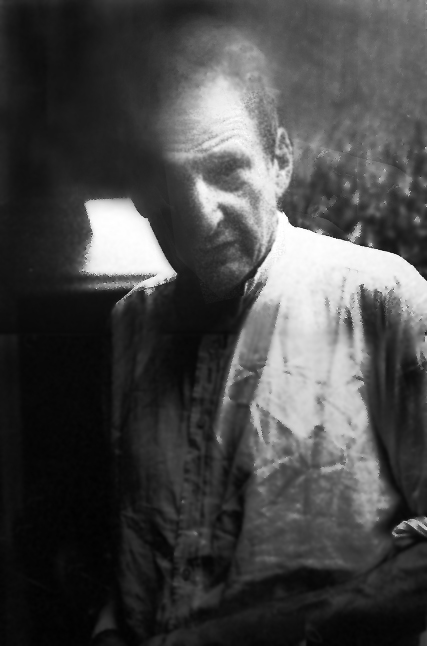
- Freud in 2005
- Born: Lucian Michael Freud; 8 December 1922; Berlin, Brandenburg, Prussia, Germany
- Died: 20 July 2011 (aged 88); London, England
- Citizenship: German, British (from 1939)
- Education: Central School of Art; East Anglian School of Painting and Drawing; Goldsmiths' College
- Notable work: Cedric Morris (1940); Portrait of Kitty (1948–49); Benefits Supervisor Sleeping (1995)
- Spouses: Kathleen Epstein (m. 1948; div. 1952) Lady Caroline Blackwood (m. 1952; div. 1959)
- Children: Various, including Annie, Esther, and Bella
- Father: Ernst L. Freud
- Relatives: Freud family

Lucian Michael Freud (/frɔɪd/; 8 December 1922 – 20 July 2011) was a British painter and draughtsman, specialising in figurative art, who is known as one of the foremost 20th-century English portraitists.

His early career as a painter was influenced by surrealism, and afterwards by expressionism, but by the early 1950s his often stark and alienated paintings tended towards realism. Freud was an intensely private and guarded man, and his paintings, completed over a 60-year career, are mostly of friends and family. They are generally sombre and thickly impastoed, often set in unsettling interiors and urban landscapes. The works are noted for their psychological penetration and often discomfiting examination of the relationship between artist and model. Freud worked from life studies and was known for asking for extended and punishing sittings from his models.

== Early life and family ==
Born in Berlin (then part of the Weimar Republic) on 8 December 1922, Freud got the name "Lucian" from his mother in commemoration of the ancient writer Lucian of Samosata. Freud's parents were German-Jewish mother, Lucie (née Brasch), and Austrian-Jewish father, Ernst L. Freud, an architect who was the fourth child of Austrian psychoanalyst Sigmund Freud. Lucian, the second of their three boys, was the elder brother of the broadcaster, writer and politician Clement Freud (thus uncle of Emma and Matthew Freud) and the younger brother of Stephan Gabriel Freud.

The family emigrated to St John's Wood, London, in 1933 to escape the rise of Nazism. Lucian attended Dartington Hall School in Totnes, Devon, and later Bryanston School for a year before being expelled for disruptive behaviour. He became a British subject in 1939.

== Early career ==
Freud briefly studied at the Central School of Art in London, and from 1939 to 1942 with greater success at Cedric Morris' East Anglian School of Painting and Drawing in Dedham, relocated in 1940 to Benton End, a house near Hadleigh, Suffolk. He also attended Goldsmiths' College, part of the University of London, in 1942–43. He served as a merchant seaman in an Atlantic convoy in 1941 before being invalided out of the service in 1942. Because of his poor physical condition, he avoided conscription, unlike his brothers.

In 1943, the poet and editor Meary James Thurairajah Tambimuttu commissioned Freud to illustrate Nicholas Moore's poetry collection The Glass Tower. It was published in 1944 by Editions Poetry London and comprised, among other drawings, a stuffed zebra and a palm tree. Both subjects reappeared in The Painter's Room on display at Freud's first solo exhibition in 1944 at the Lefevre Gallery. In the summer of 1946, he travelled to Paris before continuing to Greece for several months to visit John Craxton. In the early 1950s, he frequently visited Dublin, where he would share Patrick Swift's studio. He remained a Londoner for the rest of his life.

Freud was one of a number of figurative artists whom artist R. B. Kitaj later called the "School of London". This group was a loose collection of artists who knew each other, some intimately, and worked in London at the same time in the figurative style. The group was active contemporaneously with the boom years of abstract painting and in contrast to abstract expressionism. Major figures in the group included Freud, Kitaj, Francis Bacon, Frank Auerbach, Michael Andrews, Leon Kossoff, Robert Colquhoun, Robert MacBryde, and Reginald Gray. Freud was a visiting tutor at the Slade School of Fine Art of University College London from 1949 to 1954.

Freud's first exhibition outside of London took place in the Hartlepool Art Gallery in 1972, which was arranged by his friend the artist John Wilson McCracken, whom he had met in London.

== Mature style ==
Girl with a White Dog, 1951–1952, Tate Gallery. Portrait of Freud's first wife, Kitty Garman, the daughter of Jacob Epstein and Kathleen Garman

Freud's early paintings, which are mostly very small, are often associated with German expressionism (an influence he tended to deny) and surrealism in depicting people, plants and animals in unusual juxtapositions. Some very early works anticipate the varied flesh tones of his mature style, for example Cedric Morris (1940, National Museum of Wales), but after the end of the war he developed a thinly painted very precise linear style with muted colours, best known in his self-portrait Man with a Thistle (1946, Tate) and a series of large-eyed portraits of his first wife, Kitty Garman, such as Girl with a Kitten (1947, Tate). These were painted with tiny sable brushes and evoke Early Netherlandish painting.

In the 1950s, Freud began to focus on portraiture, often nudes (though his first full-length nude was not painted until 1966), to the almost complete exclusion of everything else, and by the middle of the decade he developed a much freer style using large hog's-hair brushes, concentrating on the texture and colour of flesh, and much thicker paint, including impasto. Girl with a White Dog (1951–52, Tate) is an example of a transitional work in this process, sharing many characteristics with paintings before and after it, with relatively tight brushwork and a middling size and viewpoint. Freud often cleaned his brush after each stroke when painting flesh, so that the colour remained constantly variable. He also started to paint standing up, which continued until old age, when he switched to a high chair. The colours of non-flesh areas in these paintings are typically muted while the flesh becomes increasingly highly and variably coloured. By about 1960, Freud had established the style that he used, with some changes, for the rest of his career. The later portraits often use an over life-size scale but are of mostly relatively small heads or in half-lengths. Later portraits are often much larger. In his late career, he often followed a portrait with an etching of the subject in a different pose, drawing directly onto the plate, with the sitter in his view.

Freud's portraits often depict only the sitter, sometimes sprawled naked on the floor or on a bed or alternatively juxtaposed with something else, as in Girl With a White Dog and Naked Man With Rat (1977–78). According to Edward Chaney, "The distinctive, recumbent manner in which Freud poses so many of his sitters suggests the conscious or unconscious influence both of his grandfather's psychoanalytical couch and of the Egyptian mummy, his dreaming figures, clothed or nude, staring into space until (if ever) brought back to health and/or consciousness. The particular application of this supine pose to freaks, friends, wives, mistresses, dogs, daughters and mother alike (the last frequently depicted after her suicide attempt and, eventually, literally mummy-like in death), tends to support this hypothesis."

The use of animals in his compositions is widespread, and often he features a pet and its owner. Other examples of portraits with both animals and people in Freud's work include Guy and Speck (1980–81), Eli and David (2005–06) and Double Portrait (1985–86). He had a special passion for horses, having enjoyed riding at school in Dartington, where he sometimes slept in the stables. His portraits solely of horses include Grey Gelding (2003), Skewbald Mare (2004), and Mare Eating Hay (2006). Wilting houseplants feature prominently in some portraits, especially in the 1960s, and Freud also produced a number of paintings purely of plants. Other regular features included mattresses in earlier works, and huge piles of the linen rags he used to clean his brushes in later ones. Some portraits, especially in the 1980s, have very carefully painted views of London roofscapes seen through the studio windows.

Freud's subjects, who needed to make a very large and uncertain commitment of their time, were often the people in his life; friends, family, fellow painters, lovers, children. He said, "The subject matter is autobiographical. It's all to do with hope and memory and sensuality and involvement, really." But the titles were mostly anonymous and the sitter's identity not always disclosed; the Duke and Duchess of Devonshire had a portrait of one of Freud's daughters as a baby for several years before he mentioned who the model was. In the 1970s, Freud spent 4,000 hours on a series of paintings of his mother, of which art historian Lawrence Gowing wrote, "it is more than 300 years since a painter showed as directly and as visually his relationship with his mother. And that was Rembrandt."

Freud painted from life and usually spent a great deal of time with each subject, demanding the model's presence even while working on the background of the portrait. Ria, Naked Portrait 2007 required 16 months of work, with the model, Ria Kirby, posing all but four evenings during that time. With each session averaging five hours, the painting took approximately 2,400 hours to complete. A rapport with his models was necessary, and while at work, Freud was reportedly "an outstanding raconteur and mimic". Of the difficulty in deciding when a painting is completed, Freud said that "he feels he's finished when he gets the impression he's working on somebody else's painting". Paintings were divided into day paintings, done in natural light, and night paintings, done under artificial light, and the sessions and lighting were never mixed.

Freud began a painting by first drawing in charcoal. He then applied paint to a small area of the canvas, and gradually worked outward from that point. For a new sitter, he often started with the head as a means of "getting to know" the person, then painted the rest of the figure, eventually returning to the head as his comprehension of the model deepened. A section of canvas was intentionally left bare until the painting was finished. The finished painting is an accumulation of richly worked layers of pigment and months of intense observation.

== Later career ==
Freud was one of the best-known British artists working in a representational style, and was shortlisted for the Turner Prize in 1989.

The major retrospective at London's Hayward Gallery in 1988 was the focal point for the BBC Omnibus programme which saw one of the few conversations with Freud ever recorded, with Omnibus director Jake Auerbach. The conversations were made possible by Duncan MacGuigan of Acquavella Galleries New York.

Benefits Supervisor Sleeping, 1995, a very large portrait of "Big Sue" Tilley, showing his handling of flesh tones, and a typical high viewpoint

Freud painted fellow artists, including Frank Auerbach and Francis Bacon, and many portraits of the performance artist Leigh Bowery. He also painted Henrietta Moraes, a muse to many Soho artists. A series of huge nude portraits from the mid-1990s depict Sue Tilley, or "Big Sue", some using her job title of "Benefits Supervisor" in the titles, such as Benefits Supervisor Sleeping (1995), which Christie's sold in 2008 for $33.6 million, setting a world record auction price for a living artist.

Freud's most consistent model in his later years was his studio assistant and friend David Dawson, the subject of his final, unfinished work. Towards the end of his life he did a nude portrait of model Kate Moss.

After Cézanne, 1999–2000, National Gallery of Australia

In 1997, Freud received the Rubens Prize of the city of Siegen. Freud's painting After Cézanne, inspired by Paul Cézanne's L'Après-midi à Naples and noteworthy because of its unusual shape, was purchased by the National Gallery of Australia for $7.4 million. Its top left section has been 'grafted' onto the main section below, and closer inspection reveals a horizontal line where the two sections were joined.

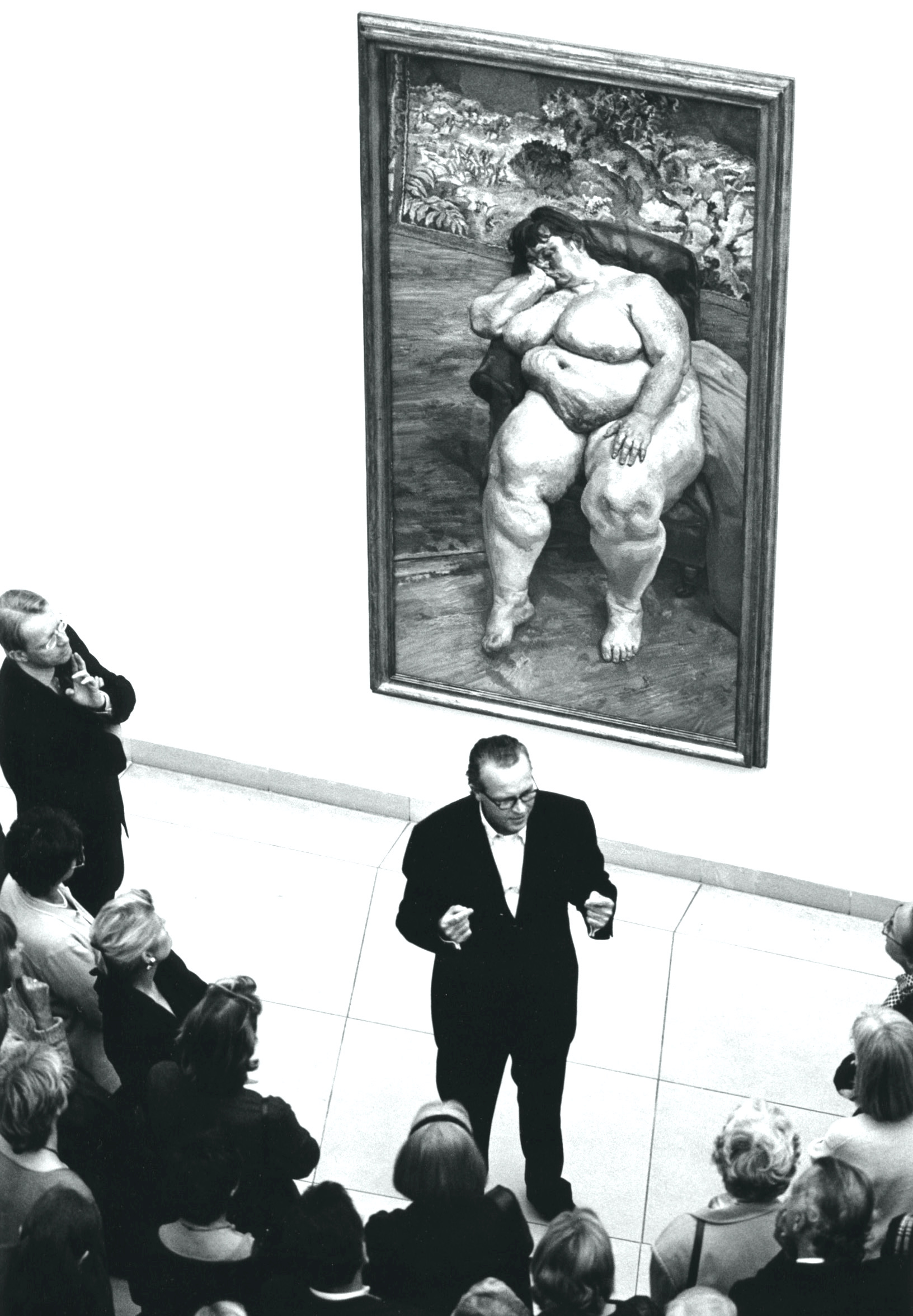
Curator Rolf Lauter giving a talk in front of Sleeping by the Lion Carpet at the 2000 exhibition in Frankfurt.

In the 25 years before Freud's death in 2011, he made etchings. He worked with advice from the Armenian-born artist and printer, Marc Balakjian at Studio Prints (founded in 1968 by Dorothea Wight) in Kentish Town, London. 143 of these prints are in the V&A's collection.

From 2000 to 2001, a large retrospective of Freud's work was held at Museum für Moderne Kunst, Frankfurt. All prints bore the motif of Freud's Sleeping by the Lion Carpet (1995–96), depicting the nude Sue Tilley. In addition to some of his most important nude portraits of women, the 1992 large-format picture Nude with leg up (Leigh Bowery) was shown in Frankfurt. It was removed in the 1993 Metropolitan Museum New York exhibition. The Frankfurt exhibition was realised in a personal dialogue between Freud and curator Rolf Lauter and is the only project Freud authorised in direct cooperation with a German museum.

In 2001, Freud completed his portrait of Queen Elizabeth II, which attracted criticism of its portrayal in the British media.

== Art market ==
In 2008, Benefits Supervisor Sleeping (1995), a portrait of civil servant Sue Tilley, sold for $33.6 million, at the time the highest price ever for a work by a living artist. At a Christie's New York auction in 2015, Benefits Supervisor Resting sold for $56.2 million. On 13 October 2011, his 1952 Boy's Head, a small portrait of his neighbour Charlie Lumley, reached $4,998,088 at Sotheby's London contemporary art evening auction, making it one of the highlights of the 2011 auction autumn season.

On 10 November 2015, Freud's 2004 painting The Brigadier, a portrait of Andrew Parker Bowles in his British Army uniform, sold for $34.89 million at Christie's, beating the $30 million presale estimate.

== Personal life and death ==
Freud and Lady Caroline Blackwood, December 1953

In the 1940s, Freud and fellow artists Adrian Ryan and John Minton were in a homosexual love triangle. After an affair with Lorna Wishart, in 1948 Freud married Lorna's niece, Kitty Garman, the daughter of sculptor Jacob Epstein and socialite Kathleen Garman, born before they were married. Lucian and Kitty Freud had two daughters, Annabel Freud and the poet Annie Freud, before their marriage ended in 1952. Kitty Freud, later known as Kitty Godley (after her marriage in 1955 to economist Wynne Godley), died in 2011.

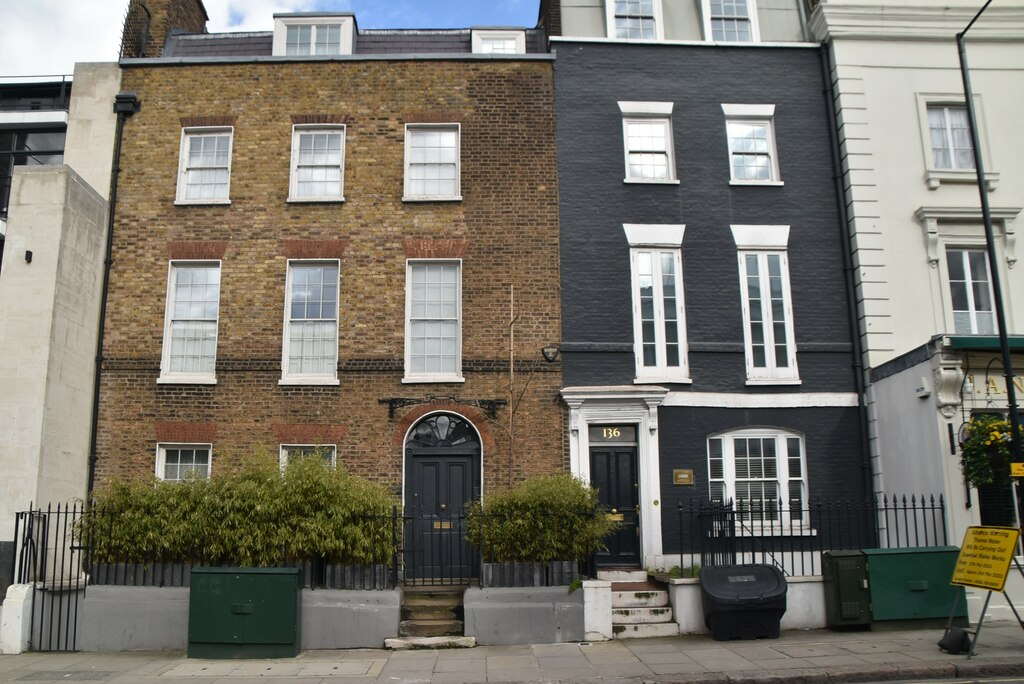
138 Kensington Church Street (left). This was Freud's residence and studio from the late 1970s until his death.

In 1952, Freud eloped with Guinness heiress and writer Lady Caroline Blackwood to Paris, where they married in 1953; they divorced in 1959. During the late 1970s and '80s, Freud was in a relationship with painter Celia Paul. Freud acknowledged 14 children, two from his first marriage and 12 out of wedlock by five women. Writer Esther Freud and fashion designer Bella Freud are his daughters by Bernadine Coverley. Geordie Greig has published a chart naming all the acknowledged children and their mothers. Greig adds, "He may have fathered as many as thirty children according to estimates by his friends (some journalists have put the figure nearer forty)".

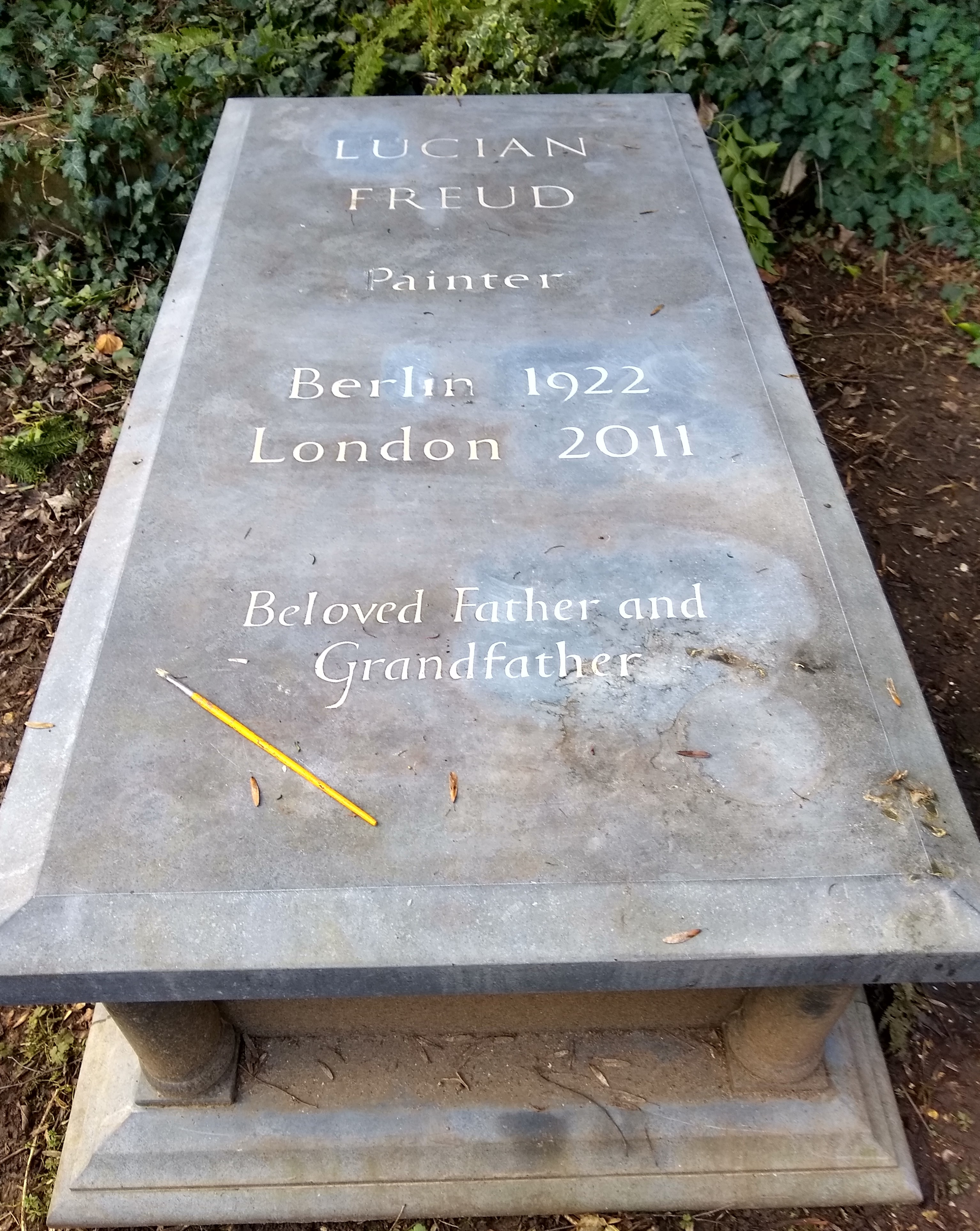
Grave of Lucian Freud at Highgate Cemetery

Phoebe Hoban writes, "At seventy-nine, Freud was still actively pursuing women at least some of whom eagerly reciprocated. In 2001, he began living with a twenty-seven-year-old journalist named Emily Bearn.... At eighty-two ... [h]is latest lover was Alexandra Williams-Wynn, an art student ... age thirty-two...." After the relationship with Williams-Wynn ended, she told Vanity Fair, "Being with Lucian ... made me understand that selfishness is what it takes to make great art".

From the 1970s until his death, Freud's home and studio was at 138 Kensington Church Street in Kensington, London, a house built in 1736–37. The building has been Grade II listed since 1984. Freud was noted for his aversion to being photographed; he once kicked a photographer upon his departure from a private dinner.

Freud died in London on 20 July 2011, of bladder cancer, and is buried in Highgate Cemetery. Archbishop Rowan Williams officiated at the private funeral.

== Selected solo exhibitions ==
Year	Title	Institution	Location	Notes	Ref
1974	Lucian Freud	Hayward Gallery	London	Followed by Bristol City Art Gallery, Birmingham City Museum and Art Gallery, and Leeds City Museum and Art Gallery	
1987	Lucian Freud Paintings	Hirshhorn Museum and Sculpture Garden	Washington, D.C.		
1993	Lucian Freud: Recent Work	Whitechapel Gallery	London		
1993 - 1994	Lucian Freud: Recent Work	Metropolitan Museum of Art	New York	58 paintings, four drawings, eight etchings	
1994	Lucian Freud: Recent Work	Museo Nacional Centro de Arte Reina Sofía	Madrid	60 works	
1993 - 1994	Lucian Freud: Early Works	Robert Miller Gallery	New York		
1996		Abbot Hall Art Gallery	Kendal	27 paintings and 13 etchings	
1997	Lucian Freud: Early Works	Scottish National Gallery of Modern Art	Edinburgh	30 drawings and paintings from 1940-1945	
2000 - 2001		Museum für Moderne Kunst	Frankfurt	50 paintings, drawings and etchings from late 1940s-2000.	
2002		Tate Britain	London		
2003		Museum of Contemporary Art	Los Angeles		
2004		The Wallace Collection	London		
2004		Scottish National Gallery	Edinburgh		
2005		Museo Correr	Venice	Coinciding with the Venice Biennale	
2006		Acquavella Galleries	New York		
2007		Irish Museum of Modern Art	Dublin		
2007		Museum of Modern Art		Etchings	
2007 - 2008		Museum of Modern Art	New York		
2008		Gemeentemuseum Den Haag	The Hague		
2010		Centre Georges Pompidou	Paris		
2012		National Portrait Gallery	London		
2012		The Modern	Fort Worth, Texas		
2013		Kunsthistorisches Museum	Vienna		
2016–2021		Irish Museum of Modern Art	Dublin		
2019-2020		Royal Academy of Arts	London		
2019-2020		Museum of Fine Arts, Boston	Boston		
2026		National Portrait Gallery	London		
2026		Louisiana Museum of Modern Art	Humlebæk		

== Bibliography ==
External videos
- Lucian Freud, Standing by the Rags, 1988–89, Smarthistory

- Blackwood, Caroline; Anne Dunn; Robert Hughes; John Russell (1993). Lucian Freud: Early Works. New York: Robert Miller Gallery. Catalog to exhibit of the same name at the Robert Miller Gallery from November 23, 1993 through January 8, 1994. Caroline Blackwood's contribution is a version of her "Portraits by Freud", listed below. Robert Hughes's contribution is excerpted from his "On Lucian Freud", listed below. John Russell's contribution is excerpted from his Lucian Freud, listed below.
- Blackwood, Caroline. "Portraits by Freud" The New York Review of Books, December 16, 1993.
- Boyt, Rose (2024). Naked Portrait: A Memoir of Lucian Freud. London: Picador. ISBN 978-1-0350-2491-9. The author is the daughter of Lucian Freud and Suzy Boyt. Review by Hettie Judah, TLS, September 6, 2024.
- Calvocoressi, Richard (1997). Early Works: Lucian Freud. Scottish National Gallery of Modern Art. ISBN 0-903598-66-3
- Conrad, Peter. "The naked and the living" The Guardian, 8 June 2022.
- Cornwell, John. "Face to face with Freud" The Sunday Times, May 22, 2005.
- Dawson, David, and Gayford, Martin, eds. (2022). Love Lucian: The Letters of Lucian Freud 1939-1954. Thames and Hudson. ISBN 978-0500024850.
- Feaver, William (1996). Lucian Freud: Paintings and Etchings. Abbot Hall Art Gallery. ISBN 0-9503335-7-3
- Feaver, William (2019). The Lives of Lucian Freud: Youth. London: Bloomsbury. Also published by Alfred A. Knopf as The Lives of Lucian Freud: The Restless Years, 1922-1968
- Feaver, William (2021). The Lives of Lucian Freud: Fame, 1968-2011. London: Bloomsbury. Also published by Alfred A. Knopf in 2020. Review by Dwight Garner. The New York Times, January 18, 2021.
- Feaver, William (2002). Lucian Freud. Tate. ISBN 0-8109-6267-5. Revised and expanded edition published by Rizzoli Electa September 8, 2026
- Feaver, William. "Freud, Lucian Michael (1922–2011)". Oxford Dictionary of National Biography (online ed.). Oxford University Press. doi:10.1093/ref:odnb/103935. (Subscription, Wikipedia Library access or UK public library membership required.)
- Gayford, Martin (2010). Man with a Blue Scarf: On Sitting for a Portrait by Lucian Freud. Thames & Hudson. ISBN 978-0-500-23875-2
- Gowing, Lawrence (1982). Lucian Freud. Thames & Hudson. ISBN 0-500-09154-4. Revised edition 2026. ISBN 978-0-500-03091-2
- Greig, Geordie (2013). Breakfast with Lucian: The Astounding Life and Outrageous Times of Britain's Great Modern Painter. Farrar, Straus and Giroux. ISBN 978-0374116484. Also published by Jonathan Cape as Breakfast with Lucian: A Portrait of the Artist. ISBN 0224096850
- Gruen, John (1991). The Artist Observed: 28 Interviews with Contemporary Artists. A Cappella Books. ISBN 1-55652-103-0
- Hoban, Phoebe (2014). Lucian Freud: Eyes Wide Open. Boston: Houghton Mifflin Harcourt. ISBN 978-0-544-11459-3.
- Holborn, Mark, and Dawson, David, eds. (2019). Lucian Freud: A Life. Phaidon Press.
- Howgate, Sarah (2012). Lucian Freud Portraits. Yale University Press. National Portrait Gallery, London exhibition catalog
- Howgate, Sarah (2026). Lucian Freud: Drawing Into Painting. London: National Portrait Gallery, London exhibition catalog ISBN 978-1-855-14815-4
- Hughes, Robert (1997). Lucian Freud Paintings (revised ed.). Thames & Hudson. ISBN 0-500-27535-1
- Hughes, Robert. "On Lucian Freud" The New York Review of Books, August 13, 1987. This article appeared in a different form in the catalog of the 1987 Hirshhorn Museum exhibition.
- Hughes, Robert. "The Master at work" The Guardian, 6 April 2004. Review of 2004 exhibit at The Wallace Collection.
- Lampert, Catherine (1993). Lucian Freud: Recent Work. Whitechapel Art Gallery. Exhibition catalog.
- Lauter, Rolf (2000), Lucian Freud: Naked Portraits. Works from the 1940s to the 1990s, Museum für Moderne Kunst, Frankfurt am Main, 29.09.2000-04.03.2001. ISBN 3-7757-9043-8, ISBN 9783775790437
- Nayeri, Farah. "Lucian Freud’s Self Portraits: But What do They Mean?" The New York Times, October 5, 2019.
- Paul, Celia (2019). Self-Portrait. New York Review Books. ISBN 978-1-68137-482-6. The author had a son, Frank Paul, by Freud.
- Russell, John (1974). Lucian Freud. The Arts Council of Great Britain. Catalog of 1974 Hayward Gallery exhibition.
- Sharp, Jasper (2013). Lucian Freud (Exhibition Catalogue of the Kunsthistorisches Museum, Vienna). Prestel. ISBN 978-3-7913-5332-6
- Smee, Sebastian (2015). Lucian Freud, 1922-2011: Beholding the Animal. TASCHEN. ISBN 978-3-8365-6063-4
- Smee, Sebastian (2016). The Art of Rivalry: Four Friendships, Betrayals, and Breakthroughs in Modern Art. Random House. ISBN 9780812994803. "Freud and Bacon", pp. 3-90.
- Warner, Marina. "Lucian Freud: The Unblinking Eye" The New York Times Magazine, December 4, 1988.
