= Farah Nayeri =

Farah Nayeri is an Iranian-born author and journalist based in London. She writes on culture for the New York Times and is the author of the 2022 book, Takedown: Art and Power in the Digital Age, which focuses on art and activism and the changing cultural landscape amid #MeToo and Black Lives Matter. The book originated from past writings, such as her article on Paul Gauguin as seen through the lens of today. She is the host of the CultureBlast podcast and is also a public speaker and moderator. Nayeri began her journalism career in Paris as a reporter for Time Magazine and a contributor to the Wall Street Journal. She later became a correspondent of Bloomberg in Paris, Rome and London, covering politics and economics, then culture.

== Books ==
- Takedown: Art and Power in the Digital Age (Astra House, 2022)
