= Brynhild Olivier =

Member of Cambridge Neo-pagans (1887–1935)

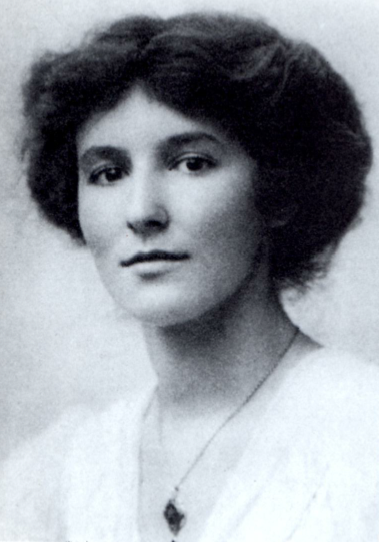
- Brynhild Olivier ca 1913
- Born: 20 May 1887; Bloomsbury, London, England
- Died: 13 January 1935 (aged 47); London, England
- Resting place: West Wittering
- Other names: Bryn Olivier; Brynhild Popham; Brynhild Sherrard
- Spouse: A. E. Popham (m. 1912–1924) F. R. G. N. Sherrard (m. 1924–1935)
- Children: Anne Olivier Bell; Philip Sherrard
- Parents: Sydney Olivier, 1st Baron Olivier (1859–1943) (father); Margaret Cox (1862–1953) (mother)
- Relatives: Margery (1886–1974) (sister); Daphne (1889–1950) (sister); Noël (1893–1969) (sister); Laurence Olivier (cousin)

Brynhild Olivier (20 May 1887 – 13 January 1935) was one of four sisters noted for their progressive ideas, beauty and associations with both Rupert Brooke and his Cambridge circle of Neo-pagans, as well as the Bloomsbury Group. Born in Bloomsbury, London, Brynhild Olivier was raised and home schooled in Jamaica and Limpsfield, Surrey. Although she had no higher education, she became involved in cultural activities at Cambridge University, through her sisters, who were undergraduates there.

Brynhild Olivier was married twice, first to the art historian, Hugh Popham in 1912, with whom she had three children, including the art scholar, Anne Olivier Bell. Later, she married (Francis) Raymond George Nason Sherrard and had three further children, including the poet Philip Sherrard. Brynhild Olivier died in London from aplastic anaemia in 1935, at the age of 47.

== Family of origin ==
The Honourable (Note: An honorific style of the daughters and sons of a baron) Brynhild Olivier, known as Bryn, was the second daughter of Sydney Olivier, 1st Baron Olivier, and his wife, Margaret Cox. Sydney Olivier, whose family was descended from French Huguenots, was a leading Fabian (along with George Bernard Shaw, Sidney Webb, and Graham Wallas), Governor of Jamaica (1907–1913) and a minister in the first Labour Government of Ramsay MacDonald in 1924 (Secretary of State for India). He was one of ten children and among his brothers were Herbert Arnould Olivier, the artist, and Gerard, father of the actor Laurence Olivier. His sisters included the author, Edith Olivier.

Margaret Cox was one of nine children of Judge Homersham Cox and Margaret Smith. One of Margaret Cox's brothers was Harold Cox the Liberal Member of Parliament, another, the mathematician Homersham Cox. Of her sisters, Agatha Cox married the sculptor Sir William Hamo Thornycroft, while Ethel Cox married Captain Alfred Carpenter, the brother of Edward Carpenter the philosopher.

Parents

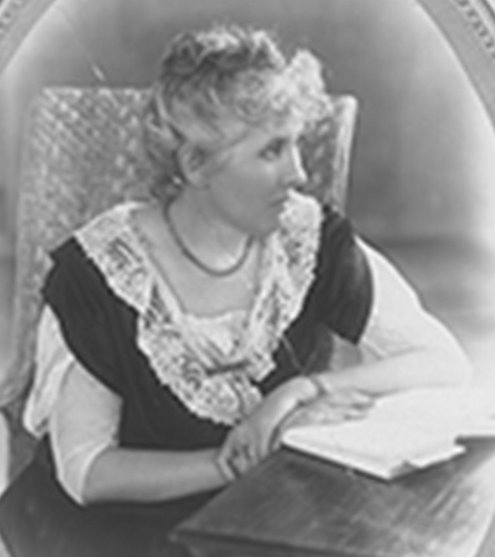
Margaret Cox

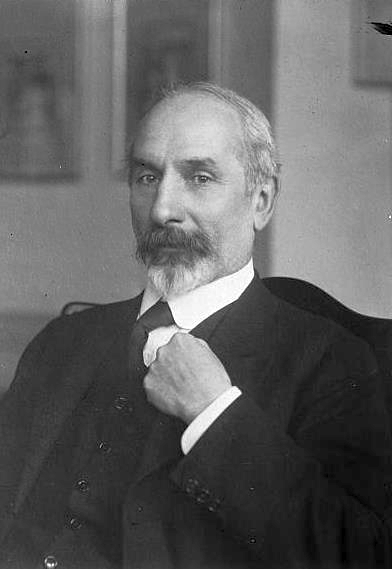
Sydney Olivier

The Oliviers were one of the founders of what came to be known as the "aristocracy of the left", a group associated with the rise of the women's movement, socialism and the Fabian Society. This group included the author, Edith Nesbit, the Webbs and the Shaws, and had close ties to William Morris and Edward Carpenter. These families, in turn raised a generation of progressive children, such as the Oliviers and the Reeves, whose daughter Amber, the Olivier daughters would encounter at Cambridge. The Shaws, who were childless, saw the Olivier girls as surrogate daughters, and the characters of George Bernard Shaw's Heartbreak House were loosely based on the Oliviers and their "siren" daughters (see Family tree).

== Childhood and education (1887–1907) ==
The Oliviers, who married in 1885, had four children:

- Margery (April 1886 – 1974)
- Brynhild (May 1887 – 1935)
- Daphne (October 1889 – 1950)
- Noël (December 1892 – 1969)

Brynhild was born in Bloomsbury, London in 1887 and named after Brynhild, the wise queen and heroine of William Morris's Sigurd the Volsung. Sydney Olivier was a career civil servant in the Colonial Office. In October 1890, when Bryn was three, Olivier received his first posting overseas, leaving his family behind in London. He served for six months as Colonial Secretary (chief administrator) in British Honduras. On his return, the Olivier family were ready for a move from London, and Margaret Olivier had been inspired by Edward Carpenter's Simple Life. They settled near Limpsfield Chart, Surrey, purchasing a cottage which they had previously used as a holiday retreat, converting it into a home, which they named "The Champions". It lay at the foot of the North Downs, overlooking the Weald, and was backed by the dense Chart woods.

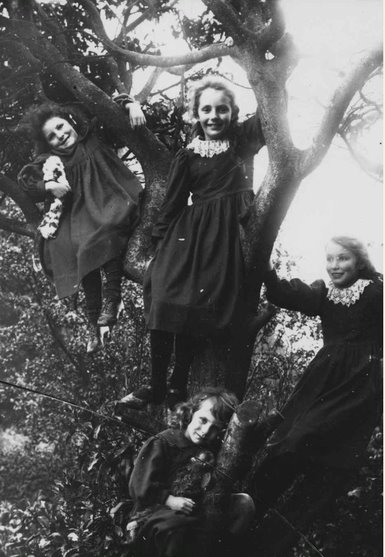
Reivilo Tribe

Like the other children in the community, the three older girls, Margery, Bryn and Daphne were all home schooled. They were also tutored for nine months in Lausanne to ensure competency in French. Later, the progressive coeducational boarding school, Bedales, in Sussex, became available for the youngest sister, Noël. Soon, like minded people started to settle in the neighbourhood. Among the first were the Peases and the Garnetts, Edward and Constance Garnett and their son, David "Bunny" Garnett. Others included Octavia Hill, the economist J. A. Hobson, the writers E. V. Lucas and Henry Salt and William and Margaret Pye, whose children included Edith, Ethel, Sybil and David. Ford Madox Ford lived there for a while and Margaret Olivier's sister Agatha and her family also moved to Surrey. Eventually the area became a hub of progressive Fabian intellectuals. There, the four Olivier sisters led a free-spirited outdoor life, disdainful of social convention, which later made them very much aligned to the ethos of Rupert Brooke's Neo-pagans, building tree houses, referring to themselves as the Reivilo (Note: Reivilo – Olivier spelled backwards) tribe, and becoming very athletic in a manner that David Garnett compared to ancient Sparta. He also described them both as "ruthless Valkyries" and as "cruel as savages". (Note: Hence the original title of Sarah Watling's biography of the sisters, Noble Savages eventually published as The Olivier Sisters. A Biography) Frances Wilson would later describe them as "feral". One woman, hired as a nursemaid to care for the children in 1892 was the future author Gertrude Dix, herself an emancipated woman who described her child rearing philosophy as "principles of freedom", allowing children to learn through experience rather than rules. Dix was a New Woman writer, and this philosophy permeated the culture of Limpsfield. Among other early childhood influences, were G. B. Shaw and H. G. Wells.

The Oliviers

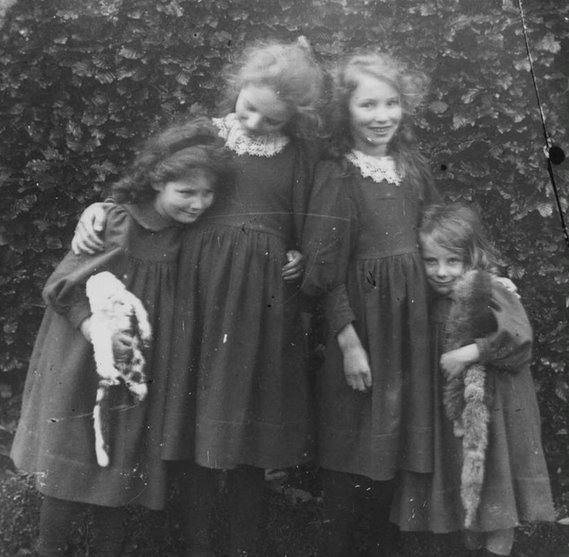
Daphne, Margerey, Brynhild, Noel 1895

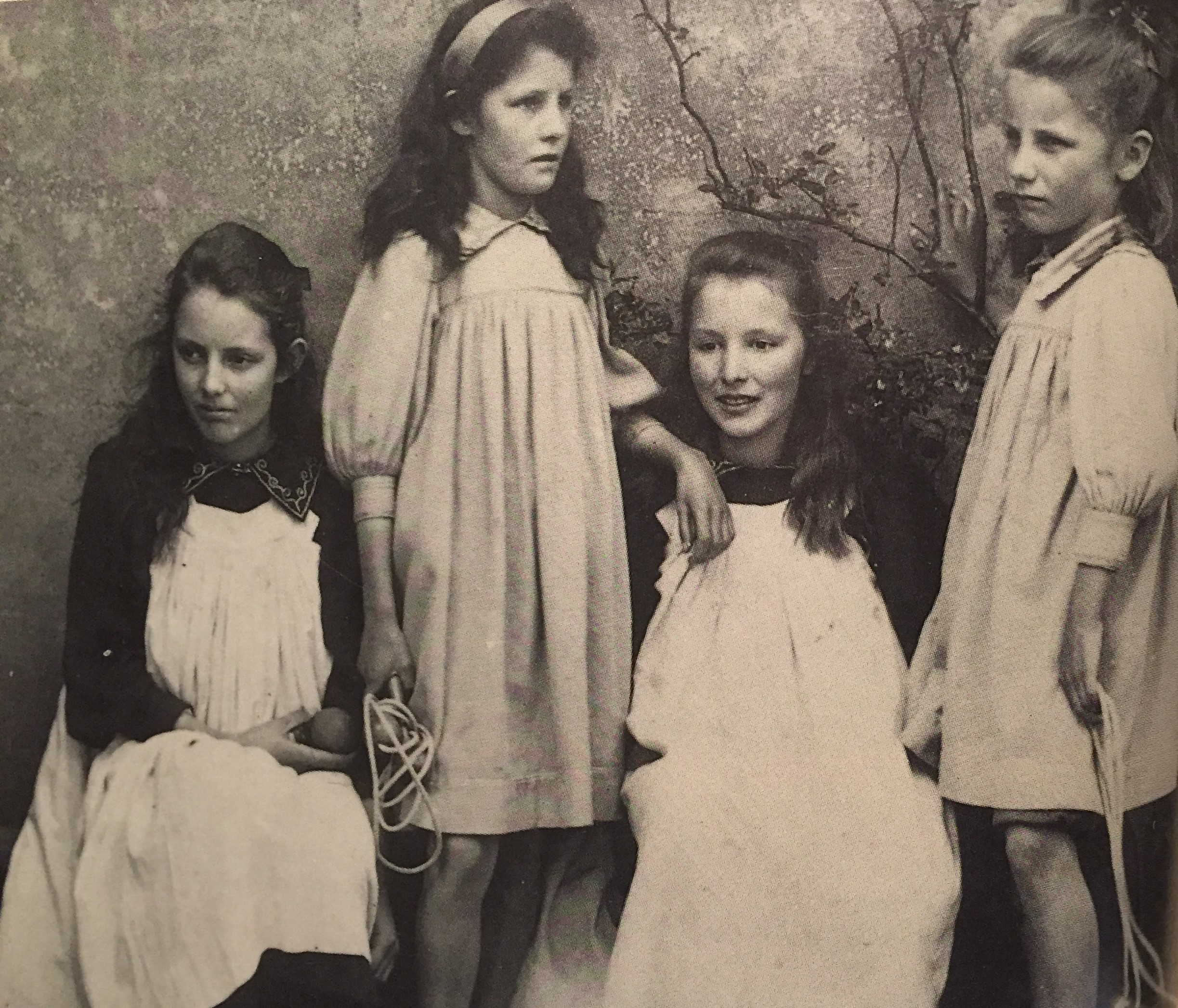
Margery, Daphne, Brynhild and Noel 1900

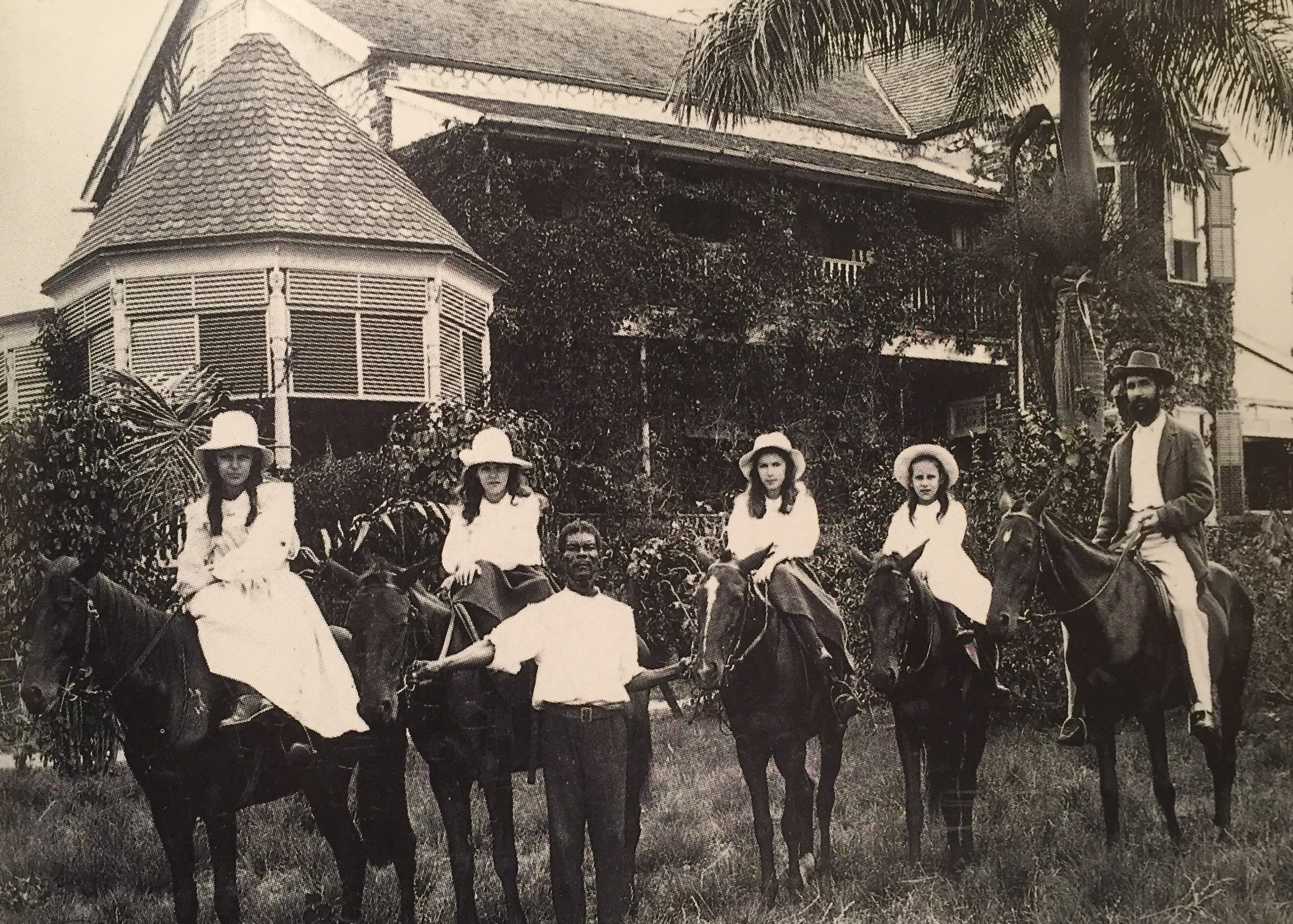
Margery, Daphne, Brynhild, Noel & Sydney Olivier, Jamaica 1903

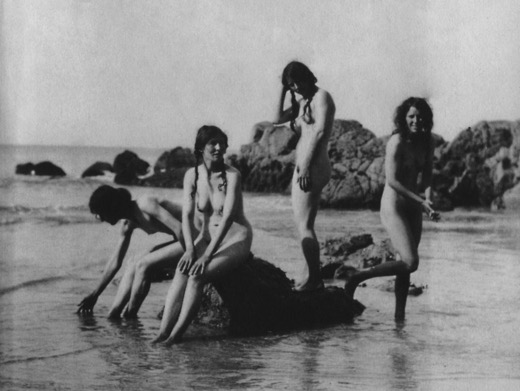
Margery, Brynhild, Noel & Daphne 1914

Sydney Olivier's duties in the Caribbean would continue to take him away from home. Following his appointment as Colonial Administrator of Jamaica (1899–1904) he decided to summon the family to join him there in 1900, for the remainder of his term. In 1907, Sir Sydney Olivier, as he had now become, left with Lady Margaret Olivier to take up the governorship of Jamaica, a position he maintained till 1913. Margery, now 21 was put in charge of bringing up her three younger sisters. For the next few years the sisters' lives were divided between England and Jamaica, keeping their mother company and performing official functions at Government House.

All four daughters (and their parents) were considered striking in their appearance, but Brynhild was considered the beauty of the family. They had also developed a reputation for unconventionality that would later come to the attention of Rupert Brooke's very protective mother, when it was reported to her: "The Oliviers! They'd do anything, those girls!". Their reputation would also lead D. H. Lawrence to warn David Garnett they were "unclean". Of the four sisters, Bryn was the only one not to successfully pursue higher education, abandoning her studies at the Royal College of Art, when her parents returned to Jamaica. (Note: Margery and Daphne went up to Newnham, Cambridge, while Noël completed a medical degree at the London School of Medicine for Women in 1917. Margery read economics (1907–1911) and got a third in her tripos, while Daphne completed hers in mediaeval and modern literature in 1913.)

== Cambridge, Rupert Brooke and the Neo-pagans (1907–1912) ==
Bryn first came to the attention of Rupert Brooke on a Cambridge University undergraduate skiing excursion to Andermatt, Switzerland in 1907. Bryn was not an undergraduate but came with her older sister Margery, an important figure in the Cambridge Fabian Society. Brooke had gone up to King's College to read classics in 1906, was a member of the steering committee of the Fabian Society and then President (1909–1910). In the evenings, the party put on performances of plays, and in Oscar Wilde's The Importance of being Earnest, Bryn played Cecily to Brooke's Algernon. Although the women were closely chaperoned by Mrs Leon, a friend of Rupert's mother, he wrote excitedly back to his maternal cousin Erica Cotterill (Note: Erica Cotterill: Rupert Brooke's mother was Mary Ruth Cotterill, whose brother was the author, Charles Clement Cotterill. Charles Clement Cotterill's daughter was Erica Cotterill) of this encounter "There is One!...oh there is One!...aged twenty, very beautiful & nice & everything...I adore her". A contemporary described her as "Most fetching...sweet, charming, gay. Very pale amber eyes".

Shortly afterwards, Bryn joined her parents in Jamaica where she spent most of 1908. In May of that year Brooke met the rest of the Oliviers when the Cambridge Fabians gave a dinner in honour of Sir Sydney, at which both he and Lady Margaret, together with Margery, Daphne and Noël attended, while Bryn remained in Jamaica. Brooke was seated opposite the fifteen year old Noël, wearing her school uniform, and although Bryn was reputedly the most beautiful, it would be her younger sister that Brooke would then pursue the most.

In July 1908, Rupert Brooke's production of Milton's Comus at Cambridge brought in many of the Newnham women to assist, and Noël was also recruited to clean paint brushes. All four daughters attended the production, and Brooke decided he was in love with Noël. Brooke then took to turning up at Bedales, Limpsfield and wherever he knew the Olivier girls might be. He and Noël began a flirtatious correspondence, becoming secretly engaged two years later. Their relationship became the source of many of his poems. Jacques Raverat, who described Bryn as having "the startled beauty of a nymph taken by surprise", formed the impression that Brooke was in love with all four sisters at once, and they with him. Brooke used his association with Margery in the Fabian Society to pursue the other daughters.

It was around this production that the loose association of friends, later dubbed Neo-pagans by the Stephen sisters, began to form around Brooke. The core group or inner circle being the four Olivier sisters, Justin Brooke, Jacques Raverat, Gwen and Frances Darwin and Ka Cox. The fringe members or outer circle included David Garnett, Geoffrey Keynes, Sybil Pye and Ethel Pye, Dudley Ward, Godwin Baynes, and Ferenc Békássy. Later it would include A. E. H. (Hugh) Popham (1889–1970), a Cambridge diving champion who Bryn would later marry, (Note: Hugh Popham was one of Brooke's friends at King's) and Bryn's maternal cousin, Rosalind Thornycroft. (Note: Rosalind Thornycroft (1891–1973) was the daughter of Agatha Cox and Sir William Hamo Thornycroft She married Helton Godwin Baynes in 1913. They separated in 1920, following which she had an affair with D. H. Lawrence in Florence, and was divorced in 1921 and then married Hugh Popham in 1926 after he and Bryn were divorced in 1924. Rosalind was the inspiration for D. H. Lawrence's Lady Chatterley's Lover, as her mother had inspired Thomas Hardy's Tess of the d'Urbervilles)

Ethel Pye's depiction of the Beaulieu River camp 1910

In 1909, camping and the outdoor life was coming into fashion, and for undergraduates replacing the reading parties, such as the one Margery and Noël attended at Bank in the New Forest at Easter that year. Baden-Powell had written Scouting for Boys in 1908, and it had been incorporated into the curriculum of Noël's school. Rupert Brooke was much taken by this trend and organised camping trips for his circle, travelling extensively in the summer months in both England and France, where Raverat had a chateau at Prunoy. In July, David Garnett assembled the group at Penshurst, Kent, close to his and the Olivier residence at Limpsfield. The three younger Olivier sisters attended, but Margery was not present to keep a watchful eye, and Brooke invited himself. The Oliviers were noted for bathing nude, which they referred to as "wild swimming", as illustrated by Gwen Raverat in her Bathers (see image). They and the men would swim in the river, under cover of darkness, illuminated by bicycle lamps. This was an extension of the Bedalian spirit that promoted nude swimming but separated the genders after they turned thirteen. (Note: Noël characteristically flouted the convention by diving in full view of everyone at a Bedalian camp) Bryn was usually the camp manager and did much of the cooking, as depicted by Ethel Pye in her painting of the Beaulieu River site in 1910 (see image).

Another one of Brooke's circle, Godwin Baynes, a medical student at Trinity and a rowing blue, was also present. The attraction that Bryn felt for Baynes was described in Brooke's poem Jealousy but when Baynes proposed shortly afterwards, she refused him. Among other considerations in this decision was that Bryn was aware that her cousin Rosalind Thornycroft considered herself Baynes' intended. Baynes was not prepared to wait indefinitely, and at Easter 1910 he proposed to Rosalind while rock climbing in Wales, and was accepted. (Note: They eventually married in September 1913) In the summer of 1909, Brooke also invited the Olivier sisters to his parents' summer home at Clevedon, on the Severn, much to his mother's consternation. In particular, Bryn demonstrated total disregard of etiquette and convention. Margery noted "It's such a responsibility taking Bryn about...people always fall in love with her". Mrs. Brooke's summary of the event was that "they are pretty, I suppose, but not all clever; they're shocking flirts and their manners are disgraceful". As a core member of the Neo-pagans Bryn was one of those who thought up the group's solemn pact to reunite at Basel Station on 1 May 1933, to start a new life, and reject growing old like their parents.

Neo-pagans

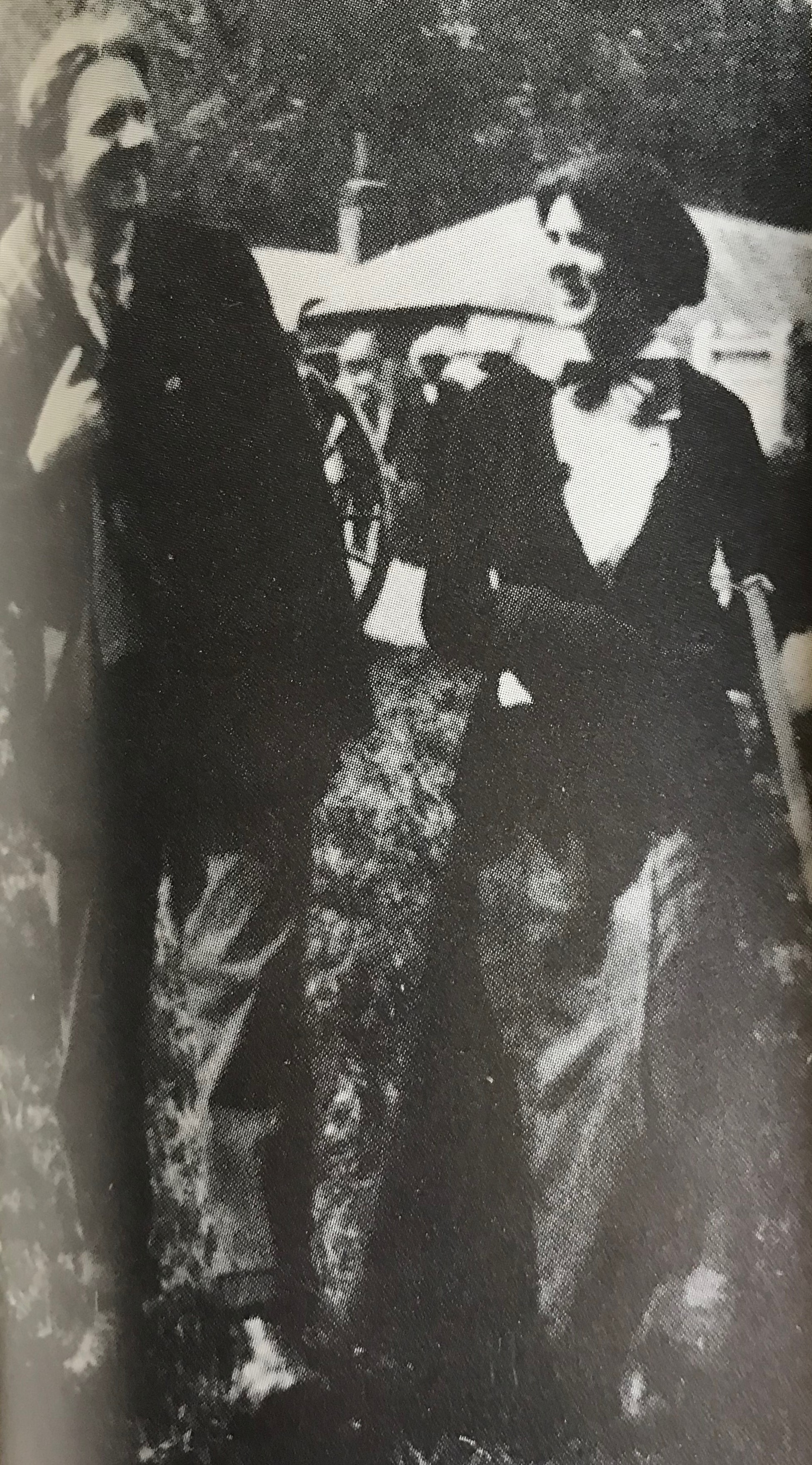
Rupert Brooke, Brynhild 1909

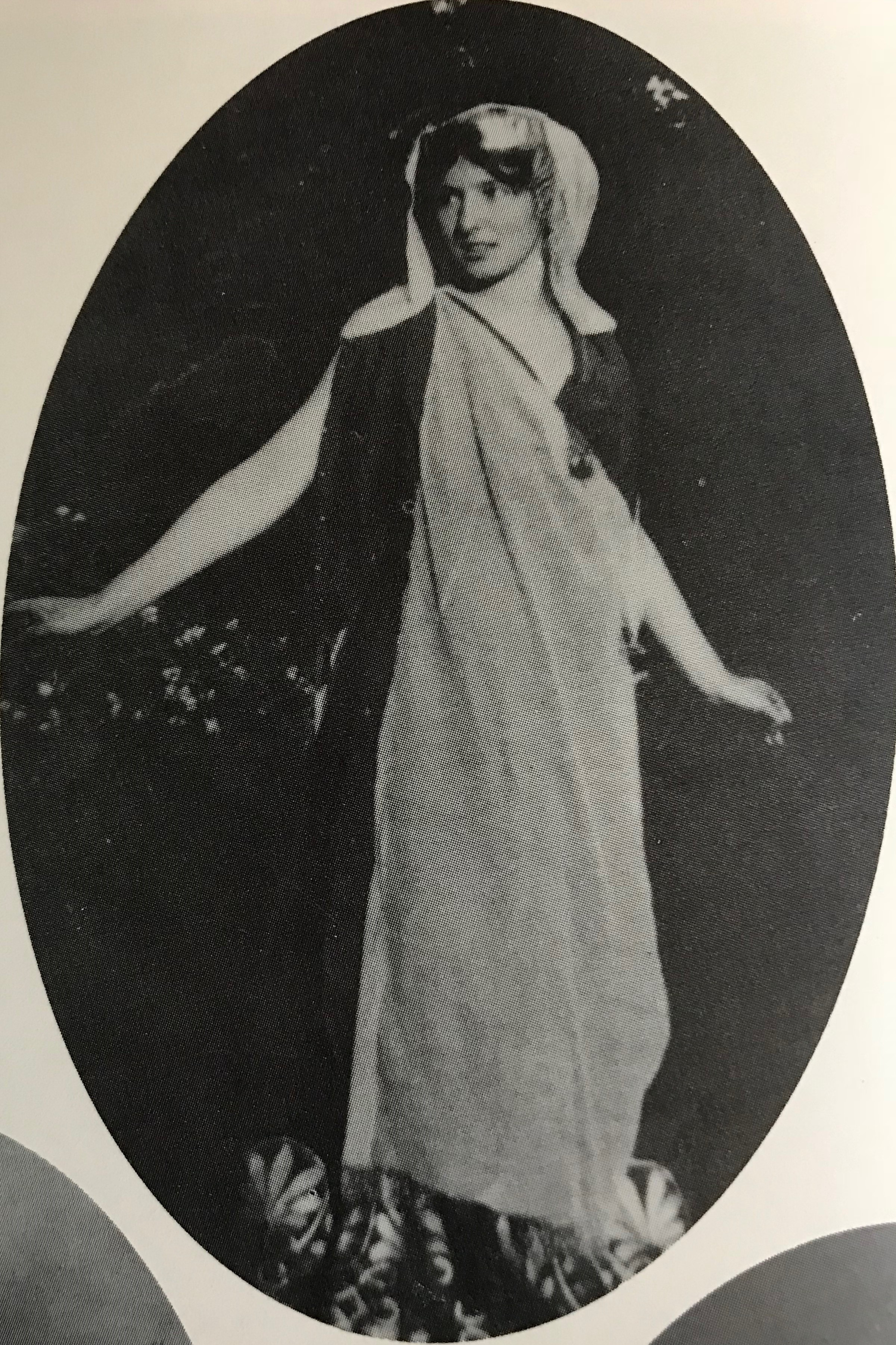
Brynhild as Helen of Troy in Marlowe's Faustus 1910

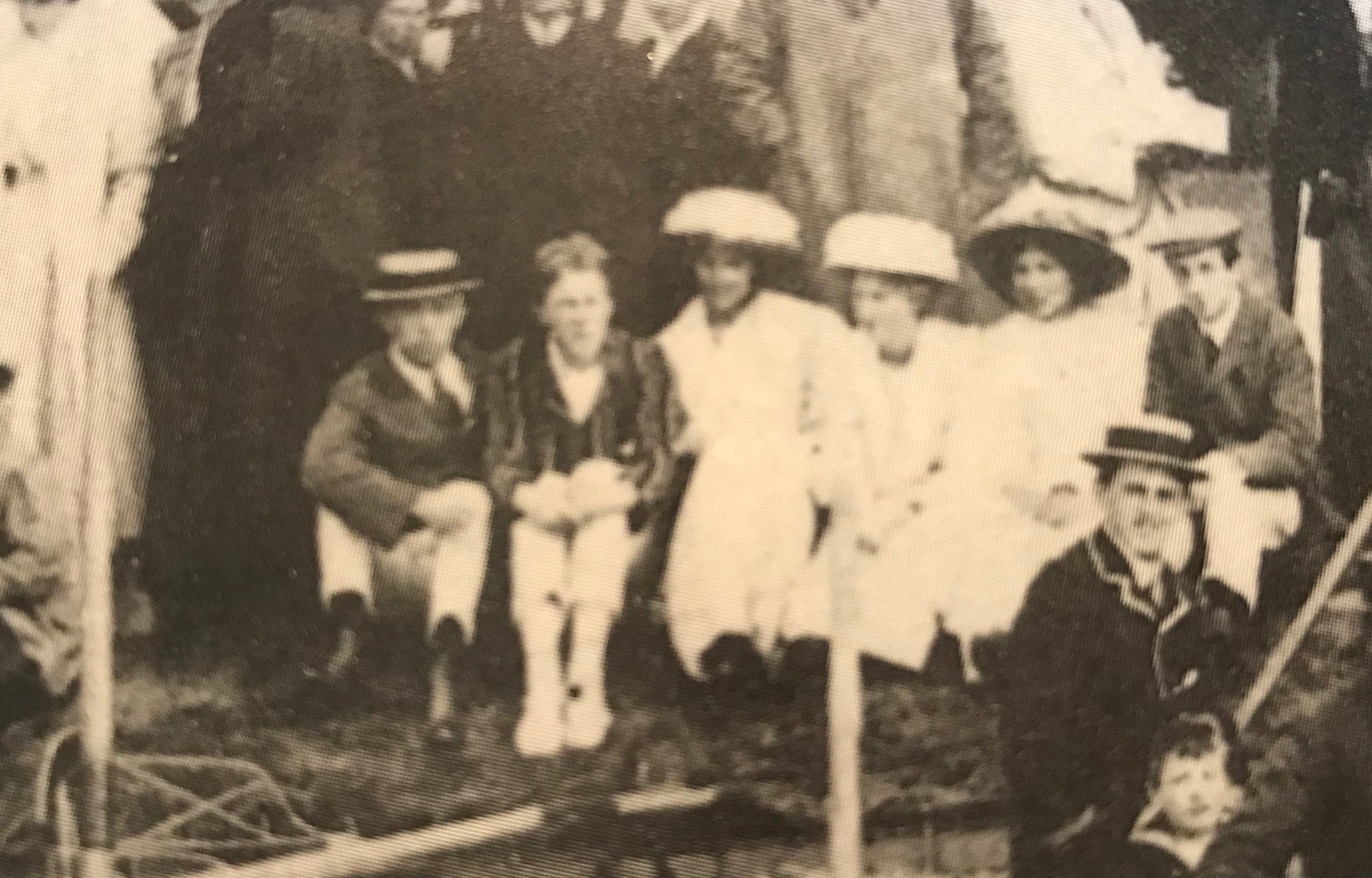
Dudley Ward, Rupert Brooke, Margery Olivier, Dolly Rose, Brynhild, Edwin Pye 1911

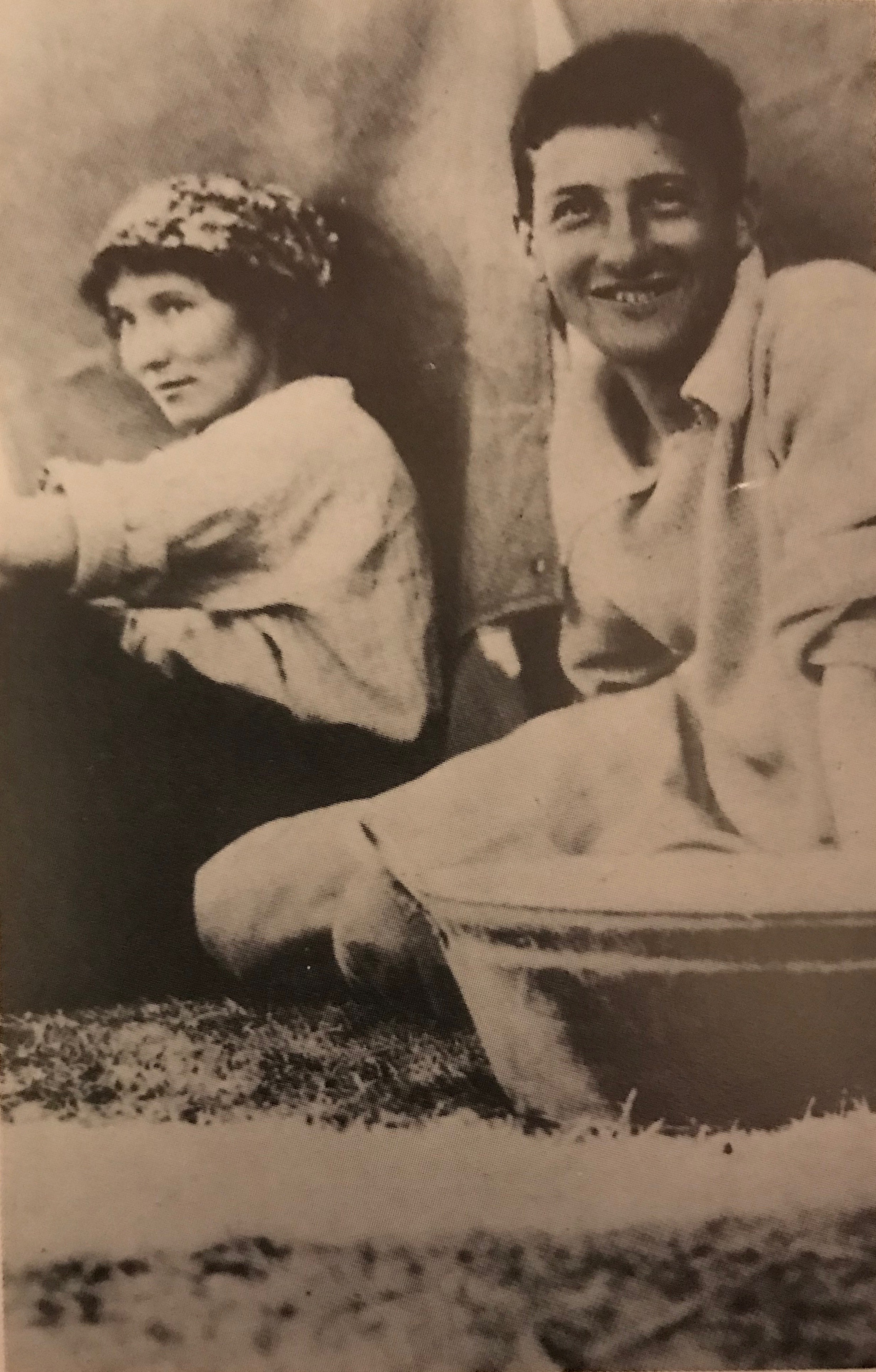
Brynhild and Justin Brooke 1911

By 1910, Bryn, now twenty-three realised she had no formal education or vocation and no immediate prospect of marriage. She had tried painting and for a while was apprenticed to a jeweller in Kent with a view to opening her own studio but found the work hard on her eyes, and incompatible with the long summer vacations she had become used to. Her mother was keen to keep her daughters close to her, and Bryn agreed to take Margery and Daphne's place in Jamaica when they returned to England in October. Before she left, she confided her unhappiness to Hugh Popham, who incorrectly took it as an invitation to propose, but she was not yet ready for that, and he was still only an undergraduate. Meanwhile, Brooke was contemplating whether he could have both Bryn and Noël on their summer excursions, but it was the latter he would soon propose to. In August of that year, the Neo-pagans staged a performance of Marlowe's Faustus at Cambridge, in which Bryn was cast as Helen of Troy in a low cut robe and hair highlighted with powdered gold (see illustration), Brooke as the Chorus, Ka Cox as Gluttony and Noël was an understudy.

In May 1911, Bryn returned to England from Jamaica with her father. She had found the time in Jamaica frustrating because the native population would not pose nude for her to paint. She kept Popham at bay, declining his invitation to May Week, and writing affectionately to Brooke that it was time she got married. During 1911 there was increasing interaction between the Neo-pagans and the Bloomsbury Group. A number of the men knew each other through Cambridge circles, in particular the Apostles. Ka Cox had also become friends with Virginia Stephen (later Virginia Woolf), whose brother was an apostle, (Note: Thoby Stephen was an apostle, though Adrian Stephen was not.) in January. The camp at Clifford Bridge in Dartmoor in August that year was referred to as "Bloomsbury under canvas".

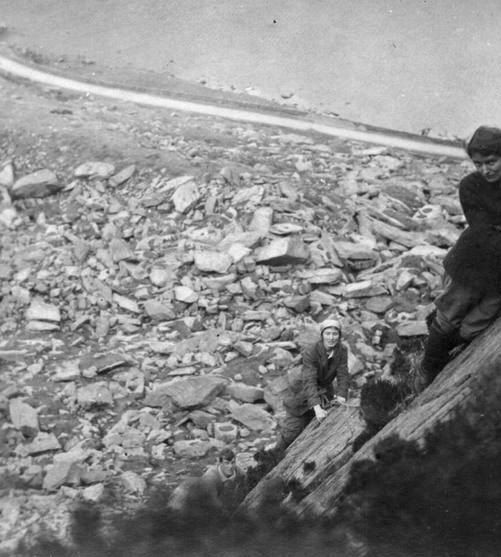
Brynhild and Margery rock climbing

In 1912, Brooke was recovering from a mental breakdown following his realisation that Ka Cox's interests might lie elsewhere. He was despairing of Noël, was feeling suicidal and started to again consider Bryn as his primary love interest. He wrote to her while she was rock climbing in Wales and asked her to join him and take care of him, which she did, although he read far more into this than she did. They then returned to London together, joining Virginia Stephen, before travelling on to Limpsfield. At the time, Virginia commented that Bryn "has a glass eye – one can imagine her wiping it bright in the morning with a duster", referring to a perceived insensitivity. At Limpsfield, Noël and Bryn pleaded with Brooke not to travel to Germany. In particular, Bryn urged him to respect his "Duty as an English Poet" to remain in England. Brook's instinctive response was to propose to her. In the end, Brooke went to Germany with Ka Cox. There, he received a firm refusal from Bryn forty days later. At Bank she had confided to him that at nineteen she had fallen in love, but had "cauterised" her passion and retained a firm self control since.

== Marriage (1912–1935) ==
When Bryn turned twenty-five in 1912, she once more took stock of her life and came to a realisation that marriage and children were things she would need to consider. Her parents were returning to Jamaica, and she had more or less abandoned her dreams of a jewellery studio. Of the possible Neo-pagan suitors, she had turned down Hugh Popham in October 1910 and avoided him since. But now, although two years her junior, he had a secure job as an art historian in the Prints Department at the British Museum and a London flat. She proposed to him in July, but he needed little encouragement to accept, inquiring of her how she felt about "children and sexual matters".

In August when the Neo-pagans met at Everleigh, Wiltshire, Brooke again tried to engage Bryn's affections, but discovered that if she did go sailing with him she would bring Popham. Frustrated, she informed him that she and Hugh Popham were to be married. Despite this news, Brooke unsuccessfully persisted in trying to get her to have an affair with him. Instead she went rock-climbing with Hugh, becoming increasingly exasperated with Brooke's emotional immaturity, confiding to James Strachey "He's evidently got to get through this – what ever this is, by himself...One comes away feeling baffled and exhausted". (Note: Letter, 4 September 2012)

Rupert Brooke was not the only one devastated by Bryn's engagement. Her sister Margery, who was starting to have delusional thoughts, had also considered Hugh Popham as a suitable husband. Brooke was invited to the wedding, but declined, although later he sent the couple two Gwen Raverat woodcuts as a wedding present.

=== Brynhild Popham (1912–1924) ===
The Pophams
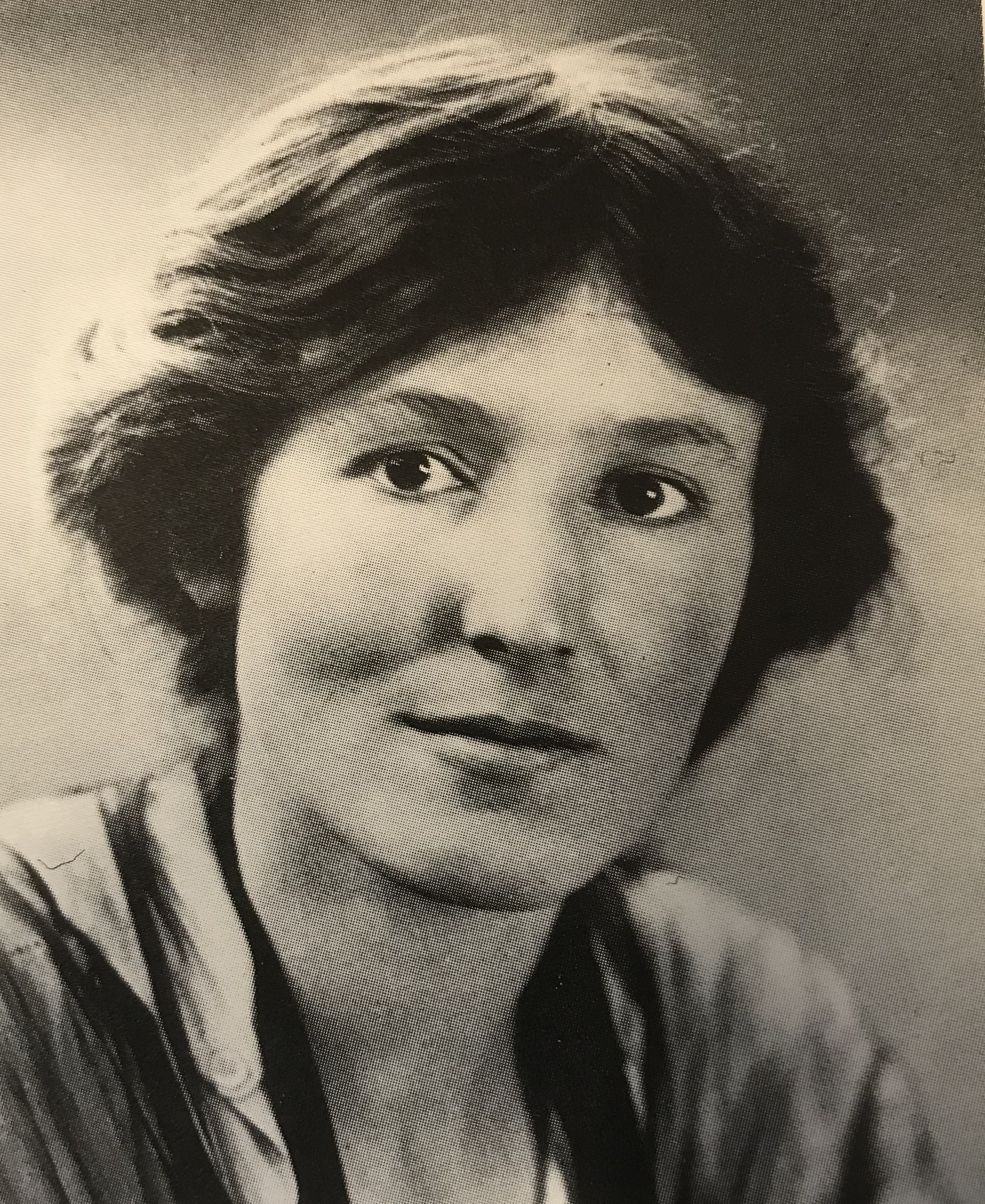
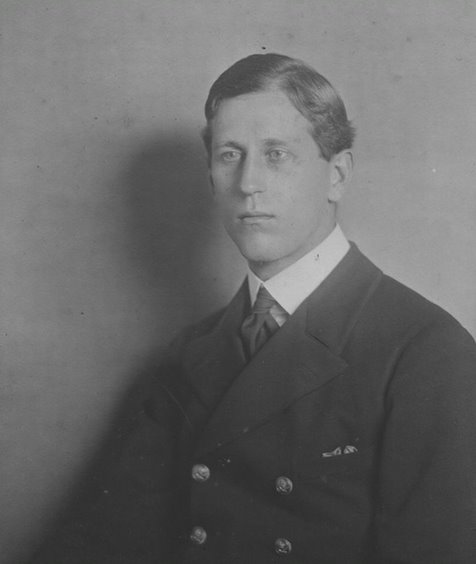

After an engagement of two and a half months, Bryn and Hugh were married on 3 October 1912, not without some misgivings. Her parents were in Jamaica and did not attend, nor did Brooke, who instead sent her a letter bewailing all their lost opportunities. The wedding took place at a registry office, and the reception at the Richelieu Palace Hotel, Oxford Street, (Note: Richelieu Hotel, 87 Oxford Street and Dean Street, designed by Philip Pilditch as the Tudor Hotel - see image) before departing by train for the Continent. After their honeymoon in Holland and Belgium, the Pophams settled at 5 Caroline Place, (Note: Renamed Mecklenburgh Place in 1938, the house was taken over by Goodenough College in 1931) Mecklenburgh Square, Bloomsbury, close to both Hugh's work at the British Museum and Noël's work at the London School of Medicine for Women on Hunter Street. Noël would soon also come to live on Mecklenburgh Square. At Caroline Place, the Pophams entertained members of both the Neo-pagan and Bloomsbury groups and held literary evenings (the Caroline Club) while also continuing to attend their summer camps. Their first child, Tony, was born in March 1914. Initially, Bryn had decided to raise him without help from a children's nurse, then unheard of in her social circle. Vanessa Bell was horrified, commenting to her sister, Virginia Woolf, that this was "too awful...she'll never be able to go away or hardly to leave the house...these young neo-pagan mothers evidently mean to do everything thoroughly". Later, she relented and their household grew to include a housekeeper and a nurse, Marie.

==== War years (1914–1918) ====
The outbreak of World War I in August 1914 was greeted with horror by most of their circle. Hugh Popham, on the other hand, welcomed it, enlisting as a volunteer in the London Regiment of the Territorial Force and was posted to Roehampton. The war first touched the Olivier sisters with the death of Rupert Brooke on 23 April 1915 but it was not so much Brooke's passing that disturbed them as the glorification of Brooke for propaganda purposes into someone they did not recognise. This was a process they refused to cooperate with. While Margery and Daphne were pacifists, with Hugh in uniform Bryn was more ambivalent, describing herself as "a patriot" she wrote "I can believe that there are things worth dying for". By May 1915, Zeppelin incendiary raids were terrifying the inhabitants of Bloomsbury, while at times the heavy gunfire from France could also be heard.

Bryn and Tony

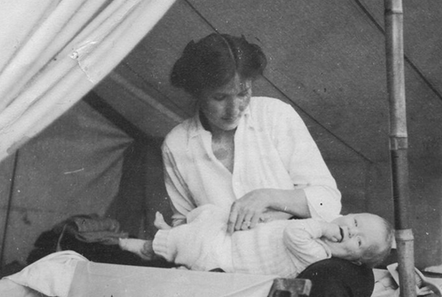
Camp 1914

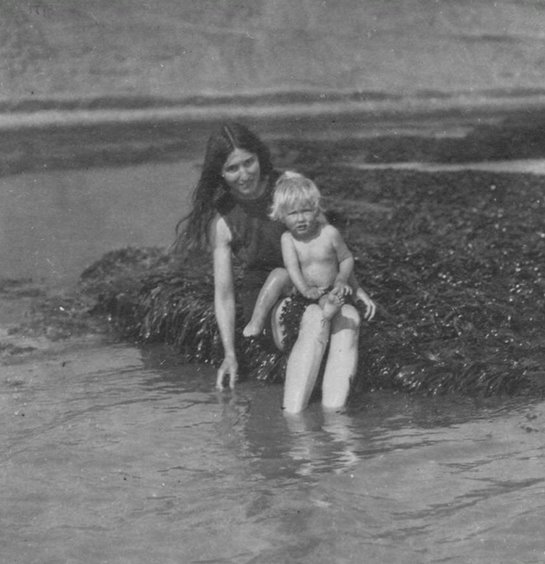
Beach 1915

In June 1916, their daughter Andy was born and conscription extended to include married men. Bryn, meanwhile busied herself with volunteer work. Hugh received a commission in the Royal Naval Air Service, then the Royal Flying Corps and was posted to RNAS Killingholme in the north of England. They decided to let Caroline Place and find a house near the base. Once more the realities of war were brought home, when Hugh, pursuing a German raider, was forced to ditch into the North Sea.

In May 1917, Hugh was posted to Port Said, Egypt for the duration of the war, and Bryn and the children returned to London. Meanwhile, Bryn's family and friends had become increasingly alarmed by her sister Margery's emotional and behavioural problems. In particular she was exhibiting attachment delusions, and in April 1917 had been admitted to the Chiswick House asylum with a diagnosis of "dementia". On returning to London, Bryn was confronted by Margery at her home, having escaped from the asylum, and realised she was going to have to assume responsibility for the care of her older sister. The Oliviers and their friends were disillusioned about the level of care for mental illness, especially after the recent breakdowns of Daphne Olivier and Virginia Woolf, and struggled to keep Margery out of the hands of organised medicine.

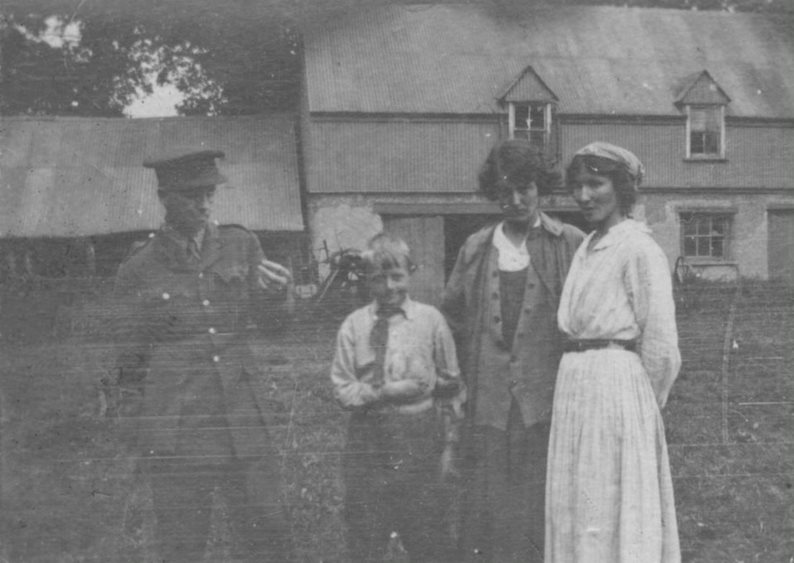
Margery with Bryn at Tatsfield

In October 1917, Bryn became convinced that it was in Margery's interests to be out of London. The Oliviers knew of an Irish doctor, Dr Caesar Sherrard (1853–1920), who had a farm at Tatsfield, Surrey, where he cared for soldiers affected by shell shock by having them work the land. Tatsfield, a village on the North Downs, overlooked Limpsfield, about four miles from the Olivier country home, The Champions. With great difficulty Bryn persuaded her sister to join her there, where they took a cottage on the farm and joined the workforce. It was there that the sisters met the doctor's colourful young nephew, Raymond Sherrard (1893–1974), (Note: Francis Raymond George Nason Sherrard) another Cambridge graduate. Sherrard was a second lieutenant in the Essex Regiment, recovering from a motorcycle accident that kept him from the front. Despite Bryn's best efforts, Margery soon transferred her fixation to Raymond Sherrard, and she asked him to stay away, but this did not last long, and soon Bryn started an affair with him.

==== Postwar (1918–1924) ====
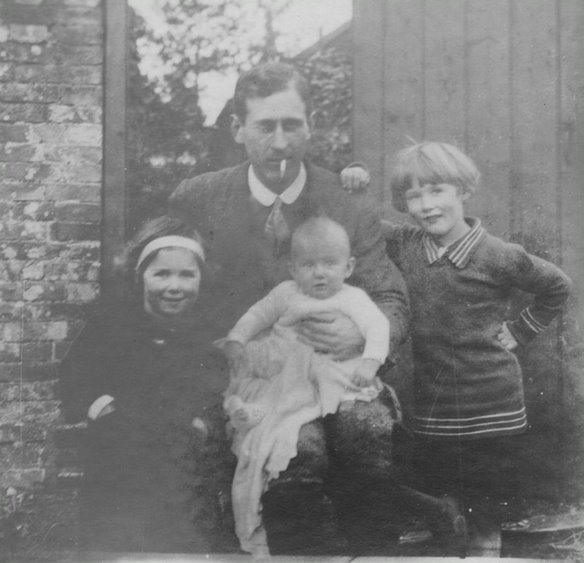
Hugh and children 1919

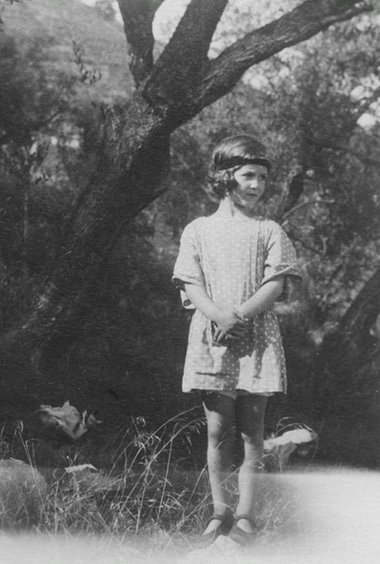
Andy ca. 1923

When the war ended in November 1918, Hugh was demobbed and returned to his job in London, while Sherrard went up to St John's College, Cambridge to read Natural Sciences. The following July, the Popham's third child, Tristram was born. Bryn continued to see Sherrard discreetly, but wanted to maintain her marriage. She confided in her husband, but was shocked to find he did not see it her way, and she was trapped between the demands of two men. She and Hugh took a house in Draycot Fitz Payne, Wiltshire, where they were the neighbours of the MacCarthys, and where she spent much of her time, Hugh Popham visiting only at weekends. There she established a local branch of the League of Nations Union in 1920. Bryn's daughter described her parents' relationship as one in which Bryn found her husband rather dry and his love for her, "dumb and beseeching". Virginia Woolf also commented that it was obvious what was happening to the marriage. (Note: Woolf to Jacques Raverat, Letters III, 93) However, in 1920 Bryn found that she was pregnant again. This time she consulted her sister Noël, now a physician, and her fiancé, Dr Arthur Richards. Abortion was illegal in Britain then, but they reluctantly and discretely arranged what they referred to as "certain services" for Bryn.

A few years later, the Pophams moved their home to Ramsden, where Bryn's parents had retired. Sherrard, who had recently graduated, also moved to Oxfordshire to be nearby, and eventually moved in. He continued to pressure Bryn, eventually persuading her to reluctantly have his child. She did so in the hope of changing his behaviour. She soon concluded that it had made "everything ten times worse".

Raymond Sherrard's child, Philip, was born in September 1922. Margery, who was in and out of nursing homes, also spent time with her parents in Ramsden, but continued to act out her paranoid delusions, attacking people she feared or suspected. On one occasion she attacked Bryn and injured Raymond. On another, she decided that Philip was her child, and attempted to abduct him. Bryn now asked Hugh for a divorce, and with her parents, took the younger three children (Note: Tony remained at school in England) and went to stay with her uncle, Herbert Olivier, at his home in La Mortola Inferiore, Italy. Her parents still hoped the marriage was salvageable, but the situation had become more complicated by Hugh starting an affair with Bryn's married cousin, Joan Thornycroft. (Note: Joan Thornycroft was married to Herbert Farjeon, and mother of Annabel Farjeon) Bryn continued to feel torn by her loyalty to two men. Various relatives on both sides of the family, including Hugh, who was refusing to divorce her, came to stay. She considered returning to him, insisting he break up with Joan, which he refused. Bryn was acutely aware of her weak position under English divorce law, and feared she would lose custody of the children. Again, she was shocked that "a modern yong man...would ever in any circumstances attempt to take advantage of such an anti feminist law". Bryn returned to England in May 1923, and in August, she and Raymond checked into a hotel and sent a copy of the receipt to her husband, thereby providing him with what then were grounds for divorce. She was bored with her marriage, and although that year the law was changed to allow either partner to sue for divorce on the grounds of adultery, she and Hugh agreed that it should be her adultery, in order to protect his job. (Note: Matrimonial Causes Act 1923)

==== Divorce (1924) ====
The Popham's divorce case was finally heard in the courts in 1924. (Note: Royal Courts of Justice, Middlesex) The timing was unfortunate for the Olivier family. Sydney Olivier had just been appointed to cabinet, and elevated to the peerage. Divorce was still uncommon but increasing, and reported salaciously in the press. The divorce immediately created a scandal and Hugh was granted custody of his three children. At the time, Tony and Andy were in boarding school, so only Tristram was at home with his mother, but legally Bryn had little recourse. Eventually the couple came to an informal agreement. The divorce had a negative effect on the whole family, who maintained good relationships with Hugh Popham, but not with Raymond Sherrard. In 1926 Hugh Popham married another of Bryn's cousins, Rosalind Thornycroft, now Baynes, which Bryn described as "bloody unenterprising".

Bryn had four children while she was with Hugh Popham;

- Hugh Anthony "Tony" (March 1914 – 2002)
- Anne "Andy" Olivier (22 June 1916 – 2018) (Note: Anne Olivier was Graham Bell's lover, before marrying art historian and writer Quentin Bell, a second generation member of the Bloomsbury Group. Their daughters were Virginia Nicholson and Cressida Bell. She edited the five volumes of Virginia Woolf's diaries.)
- Tristram (2 July 1919 – 1992)
- Philip Owen Arnould (23 September 1922 – 1995), poet, translator and theologian. (Note: The fourth child, Philip, was registered with Hugh Popham as the father, but the father was actually Raymond Sherrard:)

=== Brynhild Sherrard (1924–1935) ===
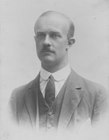
Raymond Sherrard

In 1924, Bryn married Sherrard, eight years her junior. Once the divorce became public and Raymond was cited as a co-respondent, he was dismissed from his employment. Subsequently, they took possession of Church Farm at Rushden, Hertfordshire. (Note: A Grade II Listed Building) They had few resources, with large legal bills from the divorce, Bryn having only fifty pounds a year from her father, and Raymond, who had no savings, was not accepted by her family. So she turned to H. G. Wells, as a family friend, who agreed to give them the money to make a start. In the agricultural recession of the 1930s, Raymond Sherrard was unable to repay his debts, the farm did not prosper and they went bankrupt in 1933, while Bryn ran a milk round. They had exhausted H. G. Wells' patience, but on a vacation in West Wittering, Sussex they learned that farming there was more profitable. Bryn, who was in failing health, then went to another early mentor, George Bernard Shaw, who was becoming an eminent literary figure. He agreed to lend them £2,500, with which they purchased Nunnington Farmhouse (Note: A Grade II Listed Building) there in the spring of 1934. Despite early promise, the venture rapidly foundered, and Bryn persuaded Sherrard to take a position as a scientist at the Agricultural Economics Research Institute, Oxford University, some seventy miles away, returning at weekends.

Bryn and Raymond Sherrard had two further children;

- Daphne Lucilla "Luly" Sherrard b. 1924
- Clarissa "Clary" Olivier Sherrard (1928–1994)

=== Final illness and death (1933–1935) ===
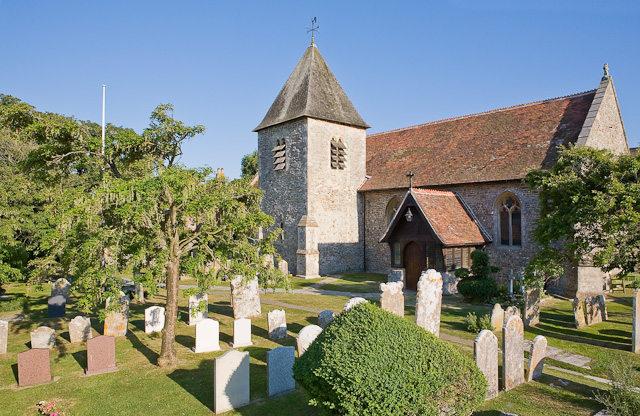
West Wittering Parish Churchyard

Bryn became ill in late 1933, with an illness that her doctors would label a "mystery disease", and diagnosed as lymphadenoma (likely Hodgkin's disease) based on lymphadenopathy in her neck and chest. She was initially treated with X-rays with no improvement. At the time she was so poor, she would walk the seven miles into Chichester for appointments, Raymond being still an undischarged bankrupt. In the summer of 1934, Bryn's father, who was paying her medical bills, became increasingly disillusioned with the treatments she was receiving, and their side effects ("not only futile but vicious"). He and Noël (Note: Noël qualified as a physician in 1917) decided to intervene by taking Bryn to Switzerland, initially to an alpine health resort at Kurhouse Val Sinestra and then to see Dr Carl Jung, meanwhile letting the farm. Jung recommended the city hospital in Zürich, where she received more radiation treatments. In Zurich she stayed in the prosperous mountainous neighbourhood of Rigiblick, (Note: Rigiblick, in Oberstrass, in the north east of Zurich) with her childhood Swiss governess. The treatments were to no avail, although she had a brief respite from her vacation. They abandoned the farm, and she saw less and less of Raymond, who now lived in Oxford and was in a new relationship, while she became confined to bed and was in and out of the local hospital. Noël, alarmed, arranged for her sister to be transferred to St Bartholomew's Hospital in London, known for its research into Bryn's condition, where she spent Christmas 1934. The move to London, brought her closer to her younger sisters (Note: Daphne was now working at the New School, in Streatham, while Noël worked at the Infants Hospital, Westminster) and to Hugh Popham, with whom she had maintained a good relationship. Her older children were now living with their father in St John's Wood, London. However, the hospital had little to offer to help Bryn. They diagnosed aplastic anaemia and gave her blood transfusions from her family, but she died in the hospital on 13 January 1935 at the age of 47 and was laid to rest in the churchyard at West Wittering. In her will, Bryn left everything to her father and to Noël. (Note: Bryn's family persuaded her to change her will three days before she died. Raymond, being a bankrupt, the house would have been seized) Her estate was listed as £5,215 3s.

After Bryn's death, Noël, as the new owner, evicted Raymond's children and used Nunnington as a holiday home. Once again, Shaw came to the rescue, enabling the debts to be paid off. The police had to be called on a number of occasions when he attempted to retake possession. Raymond eventually remarried and died in 1974.

== See also ==
- Thornycroft family

== Bibliography ==
=== Books ===
- Brooke, Rupert; Strachey, James (1998). Hale, Keith (ed.). Friends and Apostles: The Correspondence of Rupert Brooke and James Strachey, 1905-1914. Yale University Press. ISBN 978-0-300-07004-0.
- —; Olivier, Noel (1991). Harris, Pippa (ed.). Song of love: the letters of Rupert Brooke and Noel Olivier. Crown Publishing. ISBN 978-0-517-59090-4. (Full text on Internet Archive)
- Caesar, Adrian (1993). Taking it Like a Man: Suffering, Sexuality, and the War Poets: Brooke, Sassoon, Owen, Graves. Manchester University Press. ISBN 978-0-7190-3834-1.
- Chainey, Graham (1995) [1985]. A Literary History of Cambridge (Revised ed.). CUP Archive. ISBN 978-0-521-47681-2.
- Coleman, Terry (2005). Olivier: The Authorised Biography. Bloomsbury. ISBN 978-0-7475-7798-0.
- Czarnecki, Kristin; Rohman, Carrie, eds. (2011). Virginia Woolf and the Natural World. Liverpool University Press. ISBN 978-1-942954-14-9.
- Delany, Paul (1987). The Neo-pagans: Rupert Brooke and the ordeal of youth (also as The Neo-Pagans – Friendship and Love in the Rupert Brooke Circle. Macmillan). Free Press. ISBN 978-0-02-908280-5. (Full text on Internet Archive)
- — (2015). Fatal Glamour: The Life of Rupert Brooke. MQUP. ISBN 978-0-7735-8278-1. ()
- Fowler, David (2008). Youth Culture in Modern Britain, c.1920-c.1970: From Ivory Tower to Global Movement - A New History. Cambridge University Press. ISBN 978-1-137-04570-6.
- Garnett, David (1955). Flowers of the Forest. Chatto & Windus.
- Hastings, Michael (1967). The handsomest young man in England: Rupert Brooke. Michael Joseph.
- Hesilrige, Arthur, ed. (1931). Debrett's Peerage, Baronetage, Knightage and Companionage. London: Debrett's. p. 737.
- Innes, Christopher, ed. (1998). The Cambridge Companion to George Bernard Shaw. Cambridge University Press. ISBN 978-0-521-56633-9.
- Jansen, Diana Baynes (2003). Jung's Apprentice: A Biography of Helton Godwin Baynes. Daimon. ISBN 978-3-85630-626-7.
- Jones, Nigel (2014) [1999 Metro Books]. Rupert Brooke: Life, Death and Myth. Head of Zeus. ISBN 978-1-78185-715-1.
- Knights, Sarah (2015). Bloomsbury's Outsider: A Life of David Garnett. Bloomsbury Publishing. ISBN 978-1-4482-1544-7.
- Lewis, C. S. (2009). Hooper, Walter (ed.). The Collected Letters of C.S. Lewis, Volume 1: Family Letters, 1905-1931. HarperCollins. ISBN 978-0-06-194711-7.
- Lubenow, W. C. (1998). The Cambridge Apostles, 1820-1914: Liberalism, Imagination, and Friendship in British Intellectual and Professional Life. Cambridge University Press. ISBN 978-0-521-57213-2.
- Marshall, Alfred (1996). Whitaker, John K (ed.). The Correspondence of Alfred Marshall, Economist. III Towards the Close 1903–1924. Cambridge University Press. ISBN 978-0-521-55886-0.
- Nehls, Edward (1957). D. H. Lawrence: A Composite Biography. University of Wisconsin Press.
- Nicholson, Virginia (2003). Among the Bohemians: Experiments in Living 1900-1939. Penguin Books Limited. ISBN 978-0-14-193340-5. (Full text on Internet Archive)
- Olivier, Sydney Haldane (1948). Olivier, Margaret (ed.). Sydney Olivier: Letters and Selected Writings. Preface by Bernard Shaw. Allen and Unwin. (Full text available here)
- Spalding, Frances (2016) [1983]. Vanessa Bell: Portrait of the Bloomsbury Artist. I.B.Tauris. ISBN 978-1-78453-241-3.
- Read, Mike (2015). Forever England: The Life of Rupert Brooke. Biteback Publishing. ISBN 978-1-84954-866-3.
- Shaw, Bernard (2002). Michalos, Alex C; Poff, Deborah C (eds.). Bernard Shaw and the Webbs. University of Toronto Press. ISBN 978-0-8020-4123-4.
- Starr, Martin P. (2003). The Unknown God: W.T. Smith and the Thelemites. The Teitan Press, Inc. ISBN 978-0-933429-07-9.
- Watling, Sarah (2019). The Olivier Sisters: A Biography. Oxford University Press. ISBN 978-0-19-086739-3. (alternative title: Noble Savages. The Olivier Sisters: Four lives in seven fragments) (ebook version)
  - Wilson, Frances (June 2019). "Neo-Pagans at Large". Literary Review (Review).
- Williams, Stephanie (2011). Running the Show: The Extraordinary Stories of the Men who Governed the British Empire. Penguin Books Limited. ISBN 978-0-670-91808-9. (Full text on Internet Archive)
- Woolf, Virginia (1977–1984). Bell, Anne Oliver (ed.). The Diary of Virginia Woolf 5 vols. Houghton Mifflin.
- Woolf, Virginia; Raverat, Gwen; Raverat, Jacques (2003). Pryor, William (ed.). Virginia Woolf & the Raverats: A Different Sort of Friendship. Clear Books. ISBN 978-1-904555-02-5.

=== Chapters ===
- Bryden, Ronald (1998). The roads to Heartbreak House. pp. 189–194., in Innes (1998)
- Lowe, Gill (2011). Wild Swimming. Liverpool University Press. pp. 108–115. ISBN 9781942954149., in Czarnecki & Rohman (2011)

=== Articles ===
- Hipolito, Jane (1 December 2014). "They Walked Together: Owen Barfield, Walter O. Field, Cecil Harwood, C.S. Lewis". Linguaculture. 2014 (2): 9–23. doi:10.1515/lincu-2015-0026.
- Howe, Sylvia (11 May 2013). "Bloomsbury laid bare: The last member of the famous artistic set reveals all". The Independent.
- Levy, Paul (17 June 2016). "How does the last surviving member of the Bloomsbury Set celebrate her 100th birthday?". The Daily Telegraph.
- Mariz, George (2004). "Olivier, Sydney Haldane, Baron Olivier". Oxford Dictionary of National Biography (online ed.). Oxford University Press. doi:10.1093/ref:odnb/35309. (Subscription, Wikipedia Library access or UK public library membership required.)
- Hurley, Beryl (2004). "Olivier, Edith Maud". Oxford Dictionary of National Biography (online ed.). Oxford University Press. doi:10.1093/ref:odnb/38311. (Subscription, Wikipedia Library access or UK public library membership required.)
- Withers, Beryl (Spring 2016). "Limpsfield Chart in History" (PDF). Chart News. pp. 20–21.

=== Newspapers and magazines ===
- Smith, Charles Saumarez (19 July 2018). "Anne Olivier Bell obituary". The Guardian.

=== Websites ===
- Brooke, Rupert (1909). "Jealousy". Collected Poems. 1916: II. 1908–1911. Bartleby.
- "The Papers of Hugh and Brynhild (Olivier) Popham". Janus. Cambridge University Library. 2008.
- Rowbotham, Sheila (24 October 2016). "Rebel Crossings: New Women, Free Lovers, and Radicals in Britain and the United States". Verso Books.
- Sorensen, Lee, ed. (21 February 2018) [1986]. "Popham, Hugh". Dictionary of Art Historians (online ed.). Duke University.
- "Find a will. Index to wills and administrations (1858-1995)". Calendars of the Grants of Probate and Letters of Administration. The National Archives.
- "Nunnington Farmhouse: A Grade II Listed Building in West Wittering, West Sussex". British Listed Buildings. 28 October 1981.
- "Church Farm House: A Grade II Listed Building in Rushden, Hertfordshire". British Listed Buildings. 29 January 1986.
- Cowdrey, Katherine (10 April 2017). "Sarah Watling's Noble Savages to Cape in six-way auction". The Bookseller.
- Lawrenson, Deborah (13 June 2017). "Rupert Brooke at Penshurst". Provence, the Luberon and an old house on a hill...
- "Hamo Thornycroft and Agatha Cox (later Thornycroft)". Victorian Artists at Home.
- Hamblin, Bella (2016). "'Literary' family connections". Bella Hamblin.
- "Bathers 1920" (Woodcut). Raverat Archive.
- "Brooke, Rupert Chawner (1887-1915)". Introduction to archives: Rupert Brooke (Biographies). King's College, Cambridge.
- "Cotterill, Erica". Introduction to archives: Rupert Brooke (Biographies). King's College, Cambridge.
- "Brooke, Mary Ruth (née Cotterill)". Introduction to archives: Rupert Brooke (Biographies). King's College, Cambridge.
- "Caroline Place". UCL Bloomsbury Project. UCL. 14 April 2011.
- "Changes in divorce: the 20th century". Living Heritage: Relationships. Houses of Parliament.
- "Cox, Homersham (CS875H)". A Cambridge Alumni Database. University of Cambridge.
- "Cox, Harold (CS878H)". A Cambridge Alumni Database. University of Cambridge.
- Simkin, John (2016). "Sydney Olivier". History of Socialism. Spartacus Educational.
- Hurley, Beryl (2004). "Olivier, Edith Maud". Oxford Dictionary of National Biography (online ed.). Oxford University Press. doi:10.1093/ref:odnb/38311. (Subscription, Wikipedia Library access or UK public library membership required.)
- "Hamo Thornycroft". People and Portraits. National Portrait Gallery.
- "Philip Sherrard 1922-1995". Denise Harvey (Publisher).
- Simkin, John (2014). "Quentin Bell". Spartacus Educational.
- "Tudor Hotel, 87 Oxford Street, Marylebone St Johns Wood And Mayfair, Greater London". View Finder. Historic England. 1908.

Genealogy

- Cobbold, Anthony (2019). "Clarissa Olivia SHERRARD". Family Tree – The Cobbold Family History Trust.
- Oates, Adrian (2018). "Rev. Henry Arnold Olivier / Anne Elizabeth Hardcastle Arnould". Red1st: Isle of Axholme.
- "Institute Of Agricultural Economics" (PDF). Bodleian Library.
- "Marfield House, Primrose Hill, Tonbridge". The Weald of Kent, Surrey and Sussex. 2021.
