= Daphne Olivier =

One of the four Olivier sisters and founder of the Waldorf School

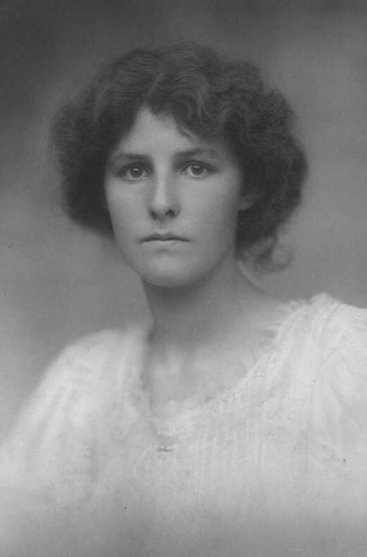
- Olivier c. 1913
- Born: 18 October 1889; Battersea, London, UKGBI
- Died: July 1950 (aged 60); Sussex, UK
- Other name: Daphne Harwood
- Education: Newnham College, Cambridge, 1913
- Occupations: Teacher; translator
- Spouse: Cecil Harwood (m. 1925)
- Children: 5
- Father: Sydney Haldane Olivier
- Relatives: Brynhild Olivier (sister); Noël Olivier (sister); Laurence Olivier (cousin); Herbert Arnould Olivier (uncle); Harold Cox (uncle); Joseph Arnould (great-uncle); Homersham Cox (grandfather)

Daphne Olivier (married name Harwood; 18 October 1889 – 14 July 1950) was a British teacher, translator and Anthroposophist. Oliver established the first Rudolf Steiner school in England.

== Early life and education ==
Olivier was born on 18 October 1889 in Battersea, London to Sydney Olivier, 1st Baron Olivier, a civil servant, politician and writer, and Margaret Olivier (née Cox; c. 1862–1953). One of four siblings, Olivier was the sister of Brynhild Olivier, a member of the Neo-pagans and the Bloomsbury Group, and the physician Noël Olivier.

Through her father, Olivier was the niece of the painter Herbert Arnould Olivier, the cousin of Laurence Olivier and the great-niece of Joseph Arnould. Olivier was the maternal granddaughter of the judge, mathematician, and writer Homersham Cox and the niece of economist and journalist Harold Cox.

Olivier studied medieval and modern languages at Newnham College, Cambridge, graduating in 1913.

== Career ==
Together with her sisters Bryn and Noël, Olivier belonged to the social circle that gathered around Rupert Brooke: a group that Virginia Woolf named the Neo-Pagans. Olivier was also a friend of John Maynard Keynes. Upon graduating in 1913, she became a teacher. Some years later, she developed an interest in the anthroposophical and educational work of Rudolf Steiner; according to Owen Barfield, she possibly attended an educational conference that Steiner held in Stuttgart in 1922. That same year she met both Barfield and his close friend Cecil Harwood at a concert tour of the English Folk Dance Society, where she sang and played the fiddle. It was through her that they both became acquainted with anthroposophy.

Olivier approached Steiner for support in starting a Waldorf School in England, gathered a group of three other women and, on being advised by Steiner to include also a male teacher, asked her friend Harwood to join. The school, called at the time "The New School" was founded in 1925 in South London. It later moved to Forest Row in East Sussex and was renamed Michael Hall. Besides her work as a teacher, Daphne translated a number of Steiner's works into English.

Harwood was a friend of C.S. Lewis and Barfield, a fellow follower of Steiner. Lewis was a frequent visitor to the couple's home in London and became godfather to their son Laurence.

== Personal life ==
On 14 August 1925, Oliver married Harwood with whom she had five children.

In July 1950, Oliver died in Sussex aged 60

== Bibliography ==
- Watling, Sarah (2019). The Olivier Sisters: A Biography. Oxford University Press. ISBN 978-0-19-086739-3. (alternative title: Noble Savages. The Olivier Sisters: Four lives in seven fragments)
- Delany, Paul. The Neo-Pagans - Friendship and Love in the Rupert Brooke Circle. Macmillan. London. 1987. ISBN 0-333-44572-4 (hc)
- C. S. Lewis, My Godfather: Letters, Photos and Recollections by Laurence Harwood, IVP Books 2007 ISBN 978-0830834983
- All My Road Before Me: The Diary of C. S. Lewis, 1922-1927 by C. S. Lewis; edited by Walter Hooper, HarperCollins 1991 ISBN 0-15-604643-1
- A Good School: A History of Michael Hall by Joy Mansfield; edited by Brien Masters and Stephen Sheen, Blue Filter 2014 ISBN 978-0956765345
