= Cecil Harwood =

Alfred Cecil Harwood (5 January 1898 – 22 December 1975) was an English lecturer, Waldorf teacher, writer, editor and anthroposophist.

== Early life ==
He was born on 5 January 1898 in Eckington, Derbyshire, the son of the Rev. William Hardy Harwood (1856–1924); his mother was Mary née Wells. His father, a Congregational minister, succeeded Henry Allon at the Union Chapel, Islington. R. Tudur Jones wrote that he "was one of the leading Nonconformists in London in the early years of the century."

Cecil Harwood attended Highgate School with Owen Barfield. In 1916 he won a classical scholarship to Christ Church, Oxford, at the same time as Barfield was awarded one at Wadham College. Harwood then joined the army, serving in World War I as an infantry officer, a 2nd lieutenant in the Royal Warwickshire Regiment.

Harwood, invalided out of the army, entered Christ Church, Oxford in 1918 (in other sources 1919). Barfield completed a B.A. degree in 1921, and for a time lived at Bee Cottage, Beckley, Oxfordshire while studying for a BLitt degree; Harwood, also a post-graduate, shared with him, and then moved to Pimlico in London with a job in publishing, sharing lodgings with Eric Beckett.

== Steiner follower ==
In the summer of 1920 Harwood and Barfield, who had both joined the English Folk Dance Society while at Oxford, went to Cornwall to join a dance concert party at St Anthony in Roseland, something they repeated in following years. In 1922 they were reported as members of the Roseland Concerts party that visited London in March. The members included Maud(e) Douie, Barfield's future wife, and the Radford sisters (Maisie, Evelyn and Marion). In 1923, according to Barfield, the teacher Daphne Olivier joined the group, as a violinist. The Radford sisters and the Olivier sisters, daughters of Sydney Olivier, had been on friendly terms since before the war, when the eldest, Margery Olivier (1886–1974), knew Evelyn Radford from Newnham College and the Fabian Society.

Daphne Olivier and Cecil Harwood met in Cornwall in 1922. She admired Rudolf Steiner, and married Harwood three years later. Harwood founded the first Waldorf school in England, the so-called "New School" that later became Michael Hall. He worked on it with Daphne Olivier and three other colleagues. He remained connected to the school for the rest his life.

== Later life ==
In 1948, a Swedish-English anthroposophist Marguerite Lundgren began teaching eurythmy in England, and met Owen Barfield and Harwood. She and Harwood married in 1953, She performed, and went on international tours. They founded the London School of Eurythmy, and with Marjorie Raffé wrote Eurythmy and the Impulse of Dance.

Harwood went blind while lecturing in 1975, and died not long afterwards in South Harbour, the house he and Marguerite had shared in Forest Row.

== Anthroposophical Society ==
Harwood joined the Anthroposophical Society in Great Britain shortly after meeting Rudolf Steiner for the first time in 1924. In 1937 he became its General Secretary. He was its Chairman from 1942 to 1968. Harwood was instrumental not just in developing the work in the United Kingdom but also in re-establishing the international relationships within the Anthroposophical Society as a whole after the internal difficulties of the 1930s and 1940s. This implied a certain amount of travel, which he undertook not just on behalf of the Society but also in assisting the growth and development of Waldorf education worldwide and in particular, in the United States.

== Associations ==
Harwood's friendships with Barfield and C. S. Lewis are documented in their biographies.

== Published works ==
- The Recovery of Man in Childhood: A Study of the Educational Work of Rudolf Steiner by Cecil Harwood, Hodder & Stoughton (1959) ASIN B001DHY9CY
- Centenary Essays on the Work and Thought of Rudolf Steiner, 1861-1925 Edited by A.C. Harwood. Hodder and Stoughton. 1961 ASIN B00109TGNW
- Shakespeare's prophetic mind by Cecil Harwood. Rudolf Steiner Press 1964 ASIN B005OWGHF6

Harwood was founder and for many years editor of Child and Man, the journal of the Waldorf Steiner schools in Great Britain, as well as writing one of the definitive works on Waldorf Education for the English-speaking world: The Recovery of Man in Childhood. Besides this, he translated into English certain central works of Anthroposophical life from Rudolf Steiner's original formulations. These were the Calendar of the Soul, a cycle of meditations through the changing seasons of the year; the Services of The Christian Community and the three texts of the Oberuferer Weihenachtsspiele, traditional Christmas plays from the village of Oberufer in today's Slovakia.

== Family ==
Harwood married, firstly in 1925, Daphne Olivier (died 1950). They had five children. He married secondly, in 1953, Marguerite Lundgren.
