= Homersham Cox (mathematician) =

English mathematician

- Born: 15 July 1857; Wimbledon, Surrey
- Died: 27 May 1918 (aged 60); Allahabad

Homersham Cox (1857–1918) was an English mathematician.

== Life ==
He was the son of Homersham Cox (1821–1897) and brother of Harold Cox and was educated at Tonbridge School (1870–75). At Trinity College, Cambridge, he graduated B.A. as 4th wrangler in 1880, and MA in 1883. He became a fellow in 1881. His younger sister Margaret, described him as a man often completely lost in his thoughts. He was married to Amy Cox. Later they separated and she started working as a governess in Russia in 1907.

Cox wrote four papers applying algebra to physics, and then turned to mathematics education with a book on arithmetic in 1885. His Principles of Arithmetic included binary numbers, prime numbers, and permutations.

Contracted to teach mathematics at Muir Central College, Cox became a resident of Allahabad, Uttar Pradesh from 1891 till his death in 1918. He was married to Amy Cox, by whom he had a daughter, Ursula Cox.

== Work on non-Euclidean geometry ==
From 1881 to 1883, he published papers on non-Euclidean geometry.

For instance, in his 1881 paper (which was published in two parts in 1881 and 1882) he described homogeneous coordinates for hyperbolic geometry, now called Weierstrass coordinates of the hyperboloid model introduced by Wilhelm Killing (1879) and Henri Poincaré (1881)). Like Poincaré in 1881, Cox wrote the general Lorentz transformations leaving invariant the quadratic form $z^2-x^2-y^2=1$, and also for $w^2-x^2-y^2-z^2=1$. He also formulated the Lorentz boost which he described as a transfer of the origin in the hyperbolic plane, on page 194:

$$\begin{align}X & =x\cosh p-z\sinh p\\
Z & =-x\sinh p+z\cosh p
\end{align} \quad \text{and} \quad \begin{align}x & =X\cosh p+Z\sinh p\\
z & =X\sinh p+Z\cosh p
\end{align}$$

Similar formulas have been used by Gustav von Escherich in 1874, whom Cox mentions on page 186. In his 1882/1883 paper, which deals with non-Euclidean geometry, quaternions and exterior algebra, he provided the following formula describing a transfer of point P to point Q in the hyperbolic plane, on page 86

$$\begin{align}
QP^{-1} & =\cosh\theta+\iota\sinh\theta\\
QP^{-1} & =e^{\iota\theta}
\end{align} \quad (\iota^2=1)$$

together with $\cos\theta+\iota\sin\theta$ with $\iota^2=-1$ for elliptic space, and $1-\iota\theta$ with $\iota^2=0$ for parabolic space. On page 88, he identified all these cases as quaternion multiplications. The variant $\iota^2=1$ is now called a hyperbolic unit, the whole expression on the left can be used as a hyperbolic versor. Subsequently, that paper was described by Alfred North Whitehead (1898) as follows:

Homersham Cox constructs a linear algebra [cf. 22] analogous to Clifford's Biquaternions which applies to Hyperbolic Geometry of two and three and higher dimensions. He also points out the applicability of Grassmann's Inner Multiplication for the expression of the distance formulae both in Elliptic and Hyperbolic Space; and applies it to the metrical theory of systems of forces. His whole paper is most suggestive.

== Cox's chain ==
In 1891 Cox published a chain of theorems in Euclidean geometry of three dimensions:

(i) In space of three dimensions take a point 0 through which pass sundry planes a, b, c, d, e,....

(ii) Each two planes intersect in a line through 0. On each such line a point is taken at random. The point on the line of intersection of the planes a and b will be called the point ab.

(iii) Three planes a, b, c, give three points bc, ac, ab. These determine a plane. It will be called the plane abc. Thus the planes a, b, c, abc, form a tetrahedron with vertices bc, ac, ab, 0.

(iv) Four planes a, b, c, d, give four planes abc, abd, acd, bcd. It can be proved that these meet in a point. Call it the point abcd.

(v) Five planes a, b, c, d, e, give five points such as abcd. It can be proved that these lie in a plane. Call it the plane abcde.

(vi) Six planes a, b, c, d, e, f, give six planes such as abcde. It can be proved that these meet in a point. Call it the point abcdef. And so on indefinitely.

The theorem has been compared to Clifford's circle theorems since they both are an infinite chain of theorems. In 1941 Richmond argued that Cox's chain was superior:

Cox's interest lay in the discovery of applications of Grassmann's Ausdehnungslehre and he uses the chain to that end. Any present-day geometer (to whom many of Cox's properties of circles in a plane must appear not a little artificial) would agree that his figure of points and planes in space is simpler and more fundamental than that of circles in a plane which he derives from it. Yet this figure of 2^{n} circles shows beyond a doubt the superiority of Cox's chain over Clifford's; for the latter is included as a special case when half the circles in the former shrink into points. Cox's plane figure of 2^{n} circles can be derived by elementary methods.

H. S. M. Coxeter derived Clifford's theorem by exchanging the arbitrary point on a line ab with an arbitrary sphere about 0 which then intersects ab. The planes a, b, c, ... intersect this sphere in circles which can be projected stereographically into a plane. The planar language of Cox then translates to the circles of Clifford.

In 1965 Cox's first three theorems were proven in Coxeter's textbook Introduction to Geometry.

== Bibliography ==
- Davies, Richard; Liddle, Peter (1990). Peace and War: The British in Russia in the 19th and Early 20th Centuries : Exhibition Catalogue. Brotherton Library, University of Leeds.
- Olivier, Sydney Haldane (1948). Olivier, Margaret (ed.). Sydney Olivier: Letters and Selected Writings. Preface by Bernard Shaw. Allen and Unwin. (Full text available here)
- Starr, Martin P. (2003). The Unknown God: W.T. Smith and the Thelemites. The Teitan Press, Inc. ISBN 978-0-933429-07-9.
