= Marguerite Lundgren =

British/Swedish eurythmist and anthroposophist (1916–1983)

Marguerite Lundgren (born 5 October 1916 in London, d. 1 August 1983 in Hamburg, Germany) was a British/Swedish eurythmist and anthroposophist.

Marguerite Lundgren was born to a Swedish father and English mother and during her childhood lived both in Sweden and England, being fluent in both languages. Through an aunt, who was one of the founders of the Wynstones School in Gloucestershire, she was able to attend the Michael Hall school, then in South London. This stimulated her interest in eurythmy, which she went on to study with Lieselotte Mann in England. In 1946, after completing her training, she joined the stage group at the. Goetheanum in Dornach, Switzerland, where her originality and talent were quickly spotted by the troupe leader, Marie Savitch. This led to a lifelong bond and common research between the two women.

In 1948, she was asked to return to England to take over the eurythmy school of Vera and Judy Compton-Burnett, where she came to know and work closely with Owen Barfield and Cecil Harwood, whom she married in 1953. Their cooperation led to her fundamental research in creating a eurythmic form specifically for the English language. For many years she taught and performed with the London School of Eurythmy, which she directed, and the London Stage Group. The work took her regularly to Scandinavia, North America and South Africa, where she did much to assist the development of eurythmy.

The last years of her life brought with them the death of her husband, Cecil Harwood, from which she never quite recovered, and the move of her eurythmy school from London to East Grinstead in Sussex, close to where they had lived for many years. She died in August 1983. The book Eurythmy and the Impulse of Dance written together with Cecil Harwood and Marjorie Raffé, records her research into the principles of eurythmy in English.

== Published work ==
- Eurythmy and the Impulse of Dance by Marjorie Raffé, Cecil Harwood, Marguerite Lundgren. Illustrations by Rudolf Steiner, Rudolf Steiner Press 1975 ISBN 0854402780, 9780854402786
