= Homersham Cox (lawyer) =

English lawyer and judge, mathematician and historian

Homersham Cox (1821–1897) was an English lawyer and judge, mathematician and historian.

== Life ==
He was born at Newington, Surrey, the fourth son of Edward Treslove, and was educated at Tonbridge School. He entered Jesus College, Cambridge in 1839, graduating B.A. in 1844, and M.A. 1852. He was admitted to the Inner Temple in 1845, and was called to the Bar 1851.

Made a County Court judge in Wales, Cox caused a furore by saying that perjury was endemic in Welsh courts. He was shortly moved to Kent, where he made his home at Mark Field House, Tonbridge. Cox died on 10 March 1897, at his home.

== Works ==
In the late 1840s Cox did theoretical work on the strength and elasticity of materials, following up experimental work of Eaton Hodgkinson.

In The Institutions of the English Government (1863), Cox argued in terms of a constitutional "balance of powers", at variance with the contemporary theorists Walter Bagehot and A. V. Dicey. A History of the Reform Bills of 1866 and 1867 was acknowledged by the author as a partisan Liberal work. It was brought out in time for the 1868 United Kingdom General Election. He was a critic of the cross-party co-operation seen in passing the Reform Bill of 1867, arguing that democracy was being undermined.

Other works were:

- The British Commonwealth, Or, A Commentary on the Institutions and Principles of British Government (1854). In it Cox argued that the Norman Conquest led to attempt to break down the local Anglo-Saxon political institutions.
- Whig and Tory administrations during the last thirteen years (1868)
- Antient Parliamentary Elections: A history showing how parliaments were constituted and representatives of the people elected in antient times (1868)
- Is the Church of England Protestant? (1875)

== Family ==
Cox married Margaret Lucy Smith. They had five daughters and four sons:

1. Homersham Cox (1857–1918), mathematician, of Muir Central College. married Amy Kiddle. Daughter: Ursula Cox.
2. Harold Cox (1859–1936), Liberal MP.
3. Margaret Cox (1861–1953), married Sydney Olivier
4. Agatha Cox (1864–1958), married Sir William Hamo Thornycroft
5. Ethel J Cox (1866–), married Captain Alfred Carpenter (brother of Edward Carpenter)
6. Oswald Cox (1868- 12 Dec 1957), solicitor, married Mabel Annie Larkin. Daughters: Theresa, Barbara, Honor
7. Hilda Cox (1870–), married George McCleary
8. Theodora Cox (1874–)
9. Cyril Cox (1877–1945), accountant and author, married Mabel Thompson

== Bibliography ==
- Farjeon, Eleanor (1997) [1958 OUP]. Edward Thomas: The Last Four Years (Revised ed.). Sutton Publishing. ISBN 978-0-7509-1337-9. (Full text on Internet Archive)
- Olivier, Sydney Haldane (1948). Olivier, Margaret (ed.). Sydney Olivier: Letters and Selected Writings. Preface by Bernard Shaw. Allen and Unwin. (Full text available here)
- Williams, Stephanie (2011). Running the Show: The Extraordinary Stories of the Men who Governed the British Empire. Penguin Books Limited. ISBN 978-0-670-91808-9. (Full text on Internet Archive)
- "Marfield House, Primrose Hill, Tonbridge". The Weald of Kent, Surrey and Sussex. 2021.
- "Oswald Cox". Ancestry. 2021.
