= Noël Olivier =

British doctor. Youngest of the four Olivier sisters

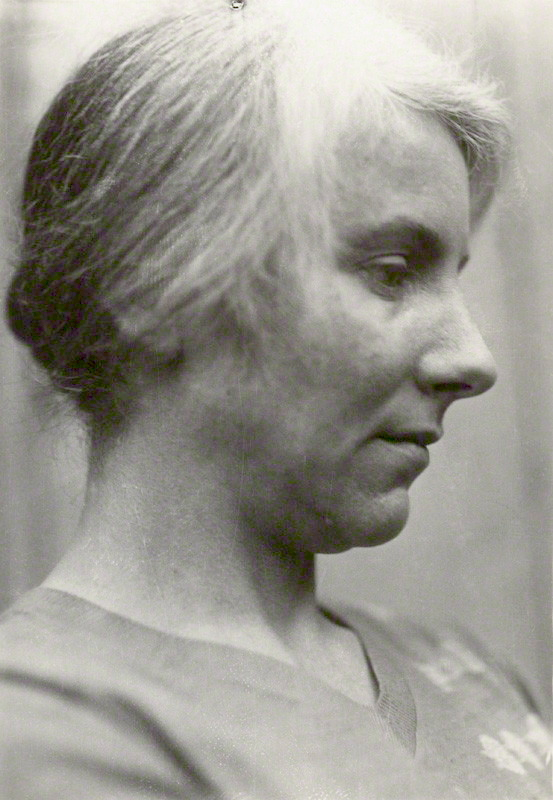
- Noël Olivier 1923
- Born: 25 December 1892; Limpsfield, Surrey, England
- Died: 11 April 1969 (aged 76); Chichester, Sussex, England
- Other name: Noël Olivier Richards
- Occupation: Physician
- Spouse: William Arthur Richards (m. 1920)
- Children: 5
- Parents: Sydney Haldane Olivier (1859–1943); Margaret Cox
- Relatives: List: Margery (1886–1974) (sister); Daphne (1889–1950) (sister); Brynhild (1887–1935) (sister); Laurence Olivier (cousin); Pippa Harris (granddaughter)

Hon. Noël Olivier Richards (25 December 1892 – 11 April 1969) was an English medical doctor. She was born on Christmas Day 1892, hence her name, as the daughter of Sydney Olivier, 1st Baron Olivier and Margaret Cox. A cousin was the actor Sir Laurence Olivier. She attended the progressive Bedales School in Petersfield, Hampshire. Later she was a member of both the Bloomsbury Group and Rupert Brooke's group of Cambridge Neopagans. For a while, she and Brooke were in a relationship.

== Early life ==
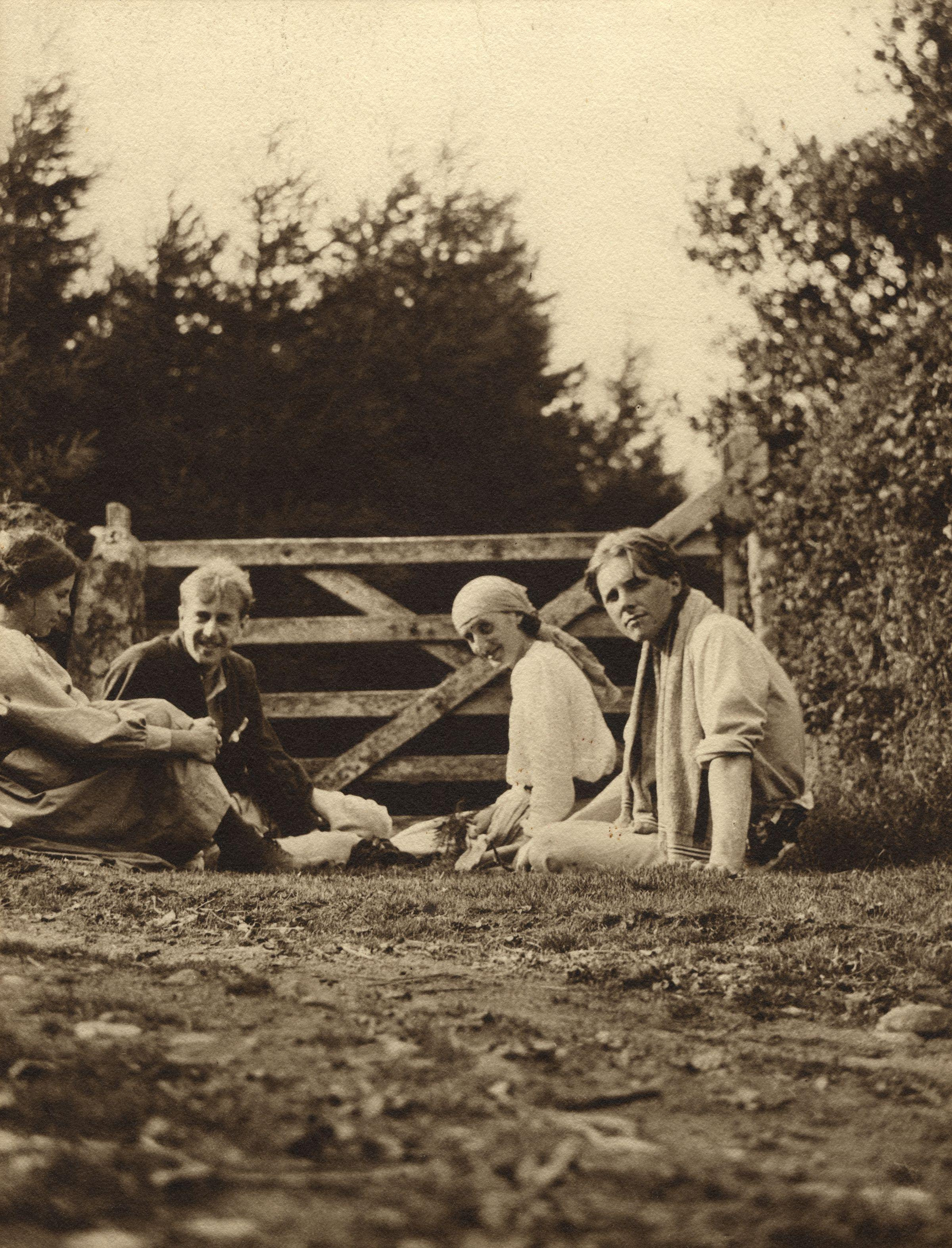
Noël Olivier; Maitland Radford; Virginia Woolf; Rupert Brooke

She met the poet Rupert Brooke at a supper party in May 1907, prior to a meeting of the Cambridge Fabians which her father had been invited to address. She was fifteen and he was twenty. He was captivated by the shy, intelligent schoolgirl and began to bombard her with letters, initiating a correspondence that was to last until his death in 1915. She became a member of a group of friends that Virginia Woolf called the "neo-pagans". The group included Dorothy Layton, Rupert Brooke, Helen Verrall, her sister Margery Olivier, Bill Hubback, Eva Spielman, Jerry Pinsent and Dolly Rose.

Some of Brooke's early poems, such as "The Hill", were written about and for his first love, Noël Olivier. Up to the time of her death in April 1969, she steadfastly refused publication of the letters which Brooke had written to her.

== Medical career ==
She graduated with the degrees of Bachelor of Surgery (BS) and Doctor of Medicine (MD). She was registered as a Member of the Royal College of Physicians, (MRCP) and the Royal College of Surgeons (MRCS).

On 29 April 1927, at a clinical meeting held at the Victoria Hospital for Children, in a section for the study of disease in children, she presented a paper entitled "A Case of Acute Lymphatic Leukæmia".

== Personal life ==
She married William Arthur Richards, son of Robert Richards and Ellen Lane of Llanelly, Carmarthenshire, on 21 December 1920 at St. Martin-in-the-Fields, London. Between 1924 and 1940 they had five children: Benedict, Angela (later Harris), Virginia, Isabelle (Tazza) and Julia. Angela Harris' daughter Pippa Harris edited Noël Olivier's correspondence with Brooke. These formed the basis of the play, Verge of Strife, by Nick Baldock, in which Kirsten Callaghan portrayed Olivier.

Her husband graduated with the degrees of Bachelor of Medicine (MB) and Bachelor of Surgery (BS). He was invested as a Fellow of the Royal College of Surgeons (FRCS). He was also registered as a Licentiate of the Royal College of Physicians.

She lived in Ickenham, Middlesex, England.

== Bibliography ==
- Watling, Sarah (2019). The Olivier Sisters: A Biography. Oxford University Press. ISBN 978-0-19-086739-3. (alternative title: Noble Savages. The Olivier Sisters: Four lives in seven fragments)
- Brooke, Rupert; Strachey, James (1998). Hale, Keith (ed.). Friends and Apostles: The Correspondence of Rupert Brooke and James Strachey, 1905-1914. Yale University Press. ISBN 978-0-300-07004-0.
- Brooke, Rupert; Olivier, Noel (1991). Harris, Pippa (ed.). Song of love: the letters of Rupert Brooke and Noel Olivier. Crown Publishing. ISBN 978-0-517-59090-4. Full text on Internet Archive
- George Mariz, George (2004). "Olivier, Sydney Haldane, Baron Olivier". Oxford Dictionary of National Biography (online ed.). Oxford University Press. doi:10.1093/ref:odnb/35309. (Subscription, Wikipedia Library access or UK public library membership required.)
