= Michael Hall (school) =

Location
- Priory Road; Forest Row, East Sussex, RH18 5JA; England; 51.0915°N 0.0244°E

Information
- Type: Private
- Religious affiliation: Christian
- Established: 1925
- Founder: Daphne Olivier, Cecil Harwood amongst others
- Department for Education URN: 114625 Tables
- Ofsted: Reports
- Principal: Stuart McWilliams
- Gender: Co-educational
- Age: 3 to 18
- Capacity: 25 per Class
- Website: http://www.michaelhall.co.uk/

Michael Hall is an independent Steiner Waldorf school in Kidbrooke Park on the edge of Ashdown Forest in East Sussex. Founded in 1925, it is the oldest Steiner school in Britain, and has a roll of 400 students aged between three (kindergarten) and eighteen (6th Form). The school owns a large amount of land.

The school offers a broad education to boys and girls from pre-school to university entrance, based on the educational philosophy of Rudolf Steiner. The curriculum embodies cultural studies, sciences, general arts and humanities, crafts, music and movement and foreign languages. EFL is available in term time. The school explains its educational ethos, curriculum and approach to prospective parents at open mornings. A range of sports, games and extra-curricular activities is offered.

Entrance is non-selective and there is no streaming; for sixth-form entry an interview is conducted and GCSE grade C (or preferably higher) is required in selected sixth-form subjects.

== History ==
The school was founded by a group of five people on the initiative of Daphne Olivier after she had attended one of Rudolf Steiner's educational conferences in Stuttgart in 1923. She approached Rudolf Steiner, asking for his support in founding the first Waldorf school in the English-speaking world. As she was speaking on behalf of three other women, Steiner asked if they could not include a suitable male teacher. This prompted Daphne to recommend her friend and future husband, Cecil Harwood, who met Rudolf Steiner in this manner for the first time and remained connected to the school for the rest of his life. It was founded in South London and named "The New School", until moving to Kidbrooke Park in Forest Row after World War II, whereupon it took on the name Michael Hall.

In November 2014 a book titled "A Good School" was published by Blue Filter documenting the first ninety years of the school's history. With an original manuscript by Joy Mansfield and edited by Brien Masters and Stephen Sheen, the book provides an overview of the school from its beginnings in Streatham to its current home in the Sussex countryside.

== Kidbrooke Park ==
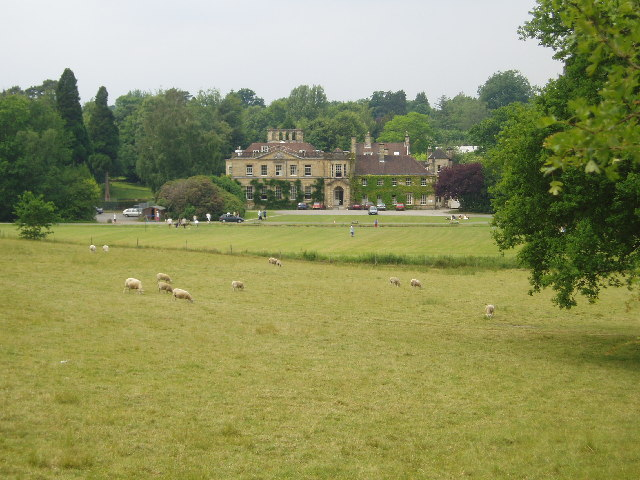

Kidbrooke Park is a grade II* listed house built for the Earl of Abergavenny at the time when Eridge Castle was in ruins and occupied by the Nevills until 1825. The date of construction is 1735 and it stands on 60 acres of parkland landscaped by the landscape architect Humphry Repton, which is separately listed at grade II.

A number of its facilities are available for hire including the reception hall (The Great Hall), The Long Room, The Round Room, The Terrace Room and The Oak Panelled Room for weddings, conferences, parties, film shoots and memorials. There is a theatre seating 450 persons, an expansive and modern gym and additional lecture studio capable of seating 80 people.

== Former students ==
There is an association of former students run by the school's administration. Former students include:

- Jean-Michel Le Gal - actor
- Michaelina Argy MBE - Thalidomide campaigner
- Gavin Carr – conductor and opera singer
- Oliver Chris – actor
- Frank Dillane – actor, known for playing Young Tom Riddle in Harry Potter and the Half Blood Prince and Nick Clark in Fear the Walking Dead
- John Davy – journalist
- Winslow Eliot – writer
- Bella Freud – Young Designer of the Year
- Eva Frommer – pioneering child psychiatrist, writer, translator and sponsor of Steiner publications
- Marguerite Lundgren – eurythmist
- Jonael Schickler – philosopher
- Oliver Tobias – actor
- Jonathan Westphal – philosopher
- Sean Yates – international cyclist
- Charlotte Tilbury - celebrity makeup artist and founder of eponymous makeup brand
- Hugh MacLeod of MacLeod, 30th Chief of Clan MacLeod
