= Spartacus Educational =

Free online encyclopedia

- Website type: Online encyclopaedia
- Available in: English
- Founded: 1984
- Headquarters: {{{location_country}}}
- Founders: Judith Harris; John Simkin
- Website: spartacus-educational.com
- Launched: September 1997; 29 years ago
- Written in: Node.js

Spartacus Educational is a free online encyclopedia with essays and other educational material on a wide variety of historical subjects, principally the struggle for equality and democracy as part of British history from 1700 and the history of the United States.

== Foundation and content ==
Based in the United Kingdom, Spartacus Educational was established as a book publisher in 1984 by former history teacher John Simkin and Judith Harris. It became an online publisher in September 1997. It grew into a large database of primary and secondary sources on a wide variety of subjects, including World War I, World War II, the Russian Revolution, abolitionism, Chartism, women's suffrage (biographies of 230 women), Nazi Germany, the Spanish Civil War, and the Cold War. Wherever possible, Simkin said that the history is told via the words of the people involved in the struggle for equality and democracy. For World War II, Simkin describes the focus of this encyclopedia as "providing background information on major political leaders from each of the countries involved in the war ... including individuals from a miscellaneous category such as: Chaing Kai-Shek and Josip Tito. ... The site has the ability to provide more of a well-rounded learning experience by illustrating how the war affected people and places all over the world." The New York Public Library recommended the articles about the history of Germany and history of Russia as educational resources.

== Reception ==
According to Marilyn Elias of the Southern Poverty Law Center, speaking about the assassination of John F. Kennedy, "the site simply reproduces a host of conspiracy theories that first appeared elsewhere". Elias also describes the site as "very shoddy, not well-sourced", citing Arthur Goldwag, author of Cults, Conspiracies, and Secret Societies.

Of Spartacus Educational, Monica Burns, an EdTech consultant for Edutopia, a free online resource in history for teaching students how to comprehend informational text, wrote in 2013 that it is "a great resource for global history. It contains free encyclopedia entries that directly connect to primary source documents, making it a perfect tool for educators looking to give students a starting point in their research."

In 2022, the new edition of Learning to Teach History in the Secondary School: a Companion to School Experience referred to Spartacus Educational as invaluable thesaurus of historical knowledge, including suggested classroom activities.
