= Sydney Olivier, 1st Baron Olivier =

British civil servant and politician (1859–1943)

The Right Honourable The Lord Olivier KCMG CB PC
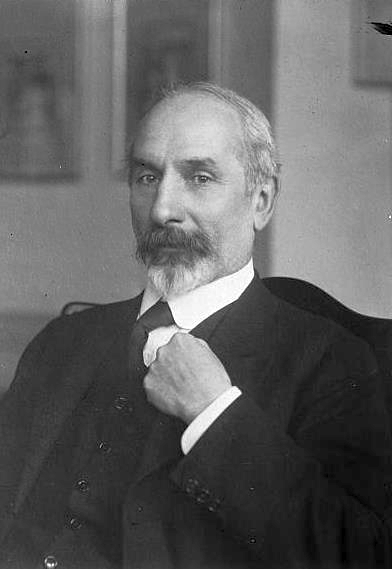

Governor of Jamaica
- In office 16 May 1907 – January 1913
- Monarchs: Edward VII; George V
- Preceded by: Hugh Clarence Bourne (acting)
- Succeeded by: Philip Clark Cork (acting)

Secretary of State for India
- In office 22 January 1924 – 3 November 1924
- Monarch: George V
- Prime Minister: Ramsay MacDonald
- Preceded by: The Viscount Peel
- Succeeded by: The Earl of Birkenhead

Personal details
- Born: Sydney Haldane Olivier; 16 April 1859 Colchester, Essex, England
- Died: 15 February 1943 (aged 83)
- Party: Labour
- Spouse: Margaret Cox
- Education: Corpus Christi College, Oxford

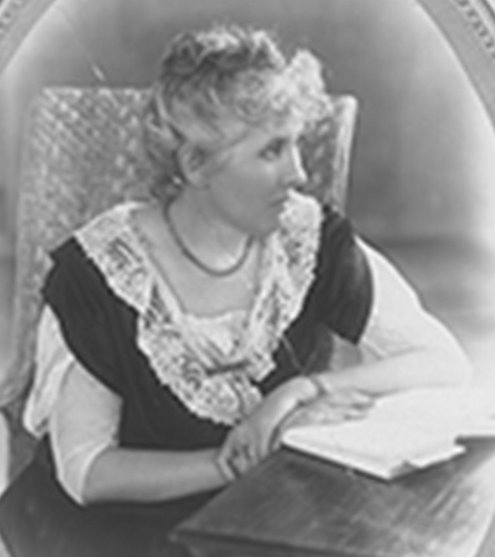
Margaret Cox

Sydney Haldane Olivier, 1st Baron Olivier, KCMG, CB, PC (16 April 1859 – 15 February 1943) was a British civil servant. A Fabian and a member of the Labour Party, he served as Governor of Jamaica and as Secretary of State for India in the first government of Ramsay MacDonald. He was an uncle of the actor Laurence Olivier.

== Background ==
Olivier was born in Colchester, the second of eight children of Anne Elizabeth Hardcastle Arnould and the Reverend Henry Arnold Olivier, a stern Anglican. His brothers included Henry (1850–1935), who had a military career ending as a colonel, Herbert, a successful portrait painter, and Gerard (1869–1939), a clergyman (the father of Laurence). During Olivier's youth, the family spent time at Lausanne and Kineton, and at Poulshott in Wiltshire, where Henry Olivier was rector. Sydney Olivier was sent to Tonbridge School, and then studied philosophy and theology at Corpus Christi College, Oxford. At Oxford he became a close friend of Graham Wallas, who came from a similar background.

After graduation, Olivier resisted family pressure to train as a barrister and instead sat the competitive examination for the Civil Service. He came first, beating Sidney Webb into second place. Olivier entered the Colonial Office in the spring of 1882, working as a resident clerk. He was joined by Webb shortly afterwards, and the two became good friends. In contrast to Webb, Olivier was an impulsive and dominating dandy, nicknamed the "socialist hidalgo". At this time Olivier also worked at Toynbee Hall in the East End of London, living in the slums of Whitechapel and teaching Latin at the Working Men's College. He was a member of the Land Reform Union, where he met George Bernard Shaw in 1883, and part of a team which in 1883 established a monthly periodical called the Christian Socialist, inspired by the Christian Socialist movement of 1848–1852. Olivier had become enthusiastic about Positivism after working as a tutor to the son of Henry Compton, a leading Positivist. He was attracted to the Positivist vision of a moral reform of capitalism, rather than mere amelioration, and for a while entertained this notion as an alternative to socialism that might be more palatable to Victorian England.

On 1 May 1885, Olivier and Sidney Webb followed Shaw's lead and enrolled in the Fabian Society, which had been formed at the start of 1884; Wallas joined the following year, and the three became known as the Three Musketeers of the Society, with Shaw as their D'Artagnan. Partly through Olivier, the Fabians would adopt the policy of reforming capitalism as a necessary precursor to explicitly socialist reforms, Olivier arguing that the sudden introduction of socialism would result in either anarchy or tyranny and attacking Marxism's neglect of non-economic values. The same month that he joined the Fabians, Olivier married Margaret Cox, the sister of Harold Cox, an old school friend and later a Liberal member of parliament. Olivier's wife was intimidated by the Fabians, preferring the less politically involved Simple Life movement, but Olivier was an eager member of the movement, serving as the Society's secretary from 1886 to 1890. He began speaking at the Hampstead Historic Society, a reading group for a number of Fabians, and developed his speaking skills to address larger meetings. In the summer of 1887, he took part in the Fabians' mock legislature experiment, the Charing Cross Parliament, as Colonial Secretary.

== Fabian and civil servant ==
In 1888 Olivier wrote the seventh Fabian tract, Capital and Land, in which he criticised Georgism (a system, popular with some Radicals and Christian Socialists, in which land continued to be privately owned and managed but should be taxed for the benefit of the community) and instead advocated the communal ownership and control of land. That year he performed with Annie Besant clerical duties at the strike headquarters during the Bryant and May match factory strike. By now he was one of the "Big Four" of the Fabian movement in London, with Shaw, Webb and Wallas. In 1889 he wrote Moral Aspects of the Basis of Socialism in the Essays in Fabian Socialism, an attempt to develop a distinct programme for the Fabians. That year he stood down as Secretary of the Fabian Society, being succeeded by Edward R. Pease. The Oliviers bought a holiday home in Limpsfield in the North Downs; they had two daughters by now, and a third was born in November. He was a guest speaker at the London School of Economics, which had many Fabian connections.

In October 1890, having established an excellent reputation at the Colonial Office, Sydney Olivier was appointed as acting Colonial Secretary of British Honduras. He continued to be active in the Fabian Society during his periods back in London. In 1891 the Oliviers made a permanent home in Limpsfield; several other Fabians and radicals moved to the area, and they soon became the dominant force on the parish council. In 1892, Olivier and Shaw attacked Robert Blatchford, Fabian leader in Manchester, for calling for members to boycott both the Conservative and Liberal parties at the ballot, regardless of the policies of individual candidates. In 1895 he was posted to the Leeward Islands as Auditor-General, a special appointment to examine and reorganise the finances of the colony. After this he returned to London, working as Private Secretary to the Under-Secretary to the Colonial Office, Lord Selbourne. In 1897 he became Secretary to the West Indian Royal Commission, and during 1898 he went to Washington to take part in trade negotiations on behalf of the West Indian Colonies.

In the run-up to the Second Boer War, the executive of the Fabian Society became split. Some Fabians, including Olivier and Ramsay MacDonald, adhering to the traditional Liberal opposition to militarism and imperialism, opposed the war; Olivier claimed that the Secretary of State for the Colonies, Joseph Chamberlain, had engineered the conflict to increase British holdings in South Africa. Other Fabians, including Webb and Shaw, believed military action could be used to promote democracy and civilisation, whilst some also felt that the best policy was to reform the British Empire rather than, as Olivier advocated, retreating from it. The majority of the leading Fabians believed that it was a just war and that the native population would be better off under the British than under the Boers, whom many saw as religious fundamentalists and bigots. After a series of close votes, the executive came out in support of the declaration of war, although the Society would change its position during the war, as the government's conduct came under scrutiny.

== Governor of Jamaica ==
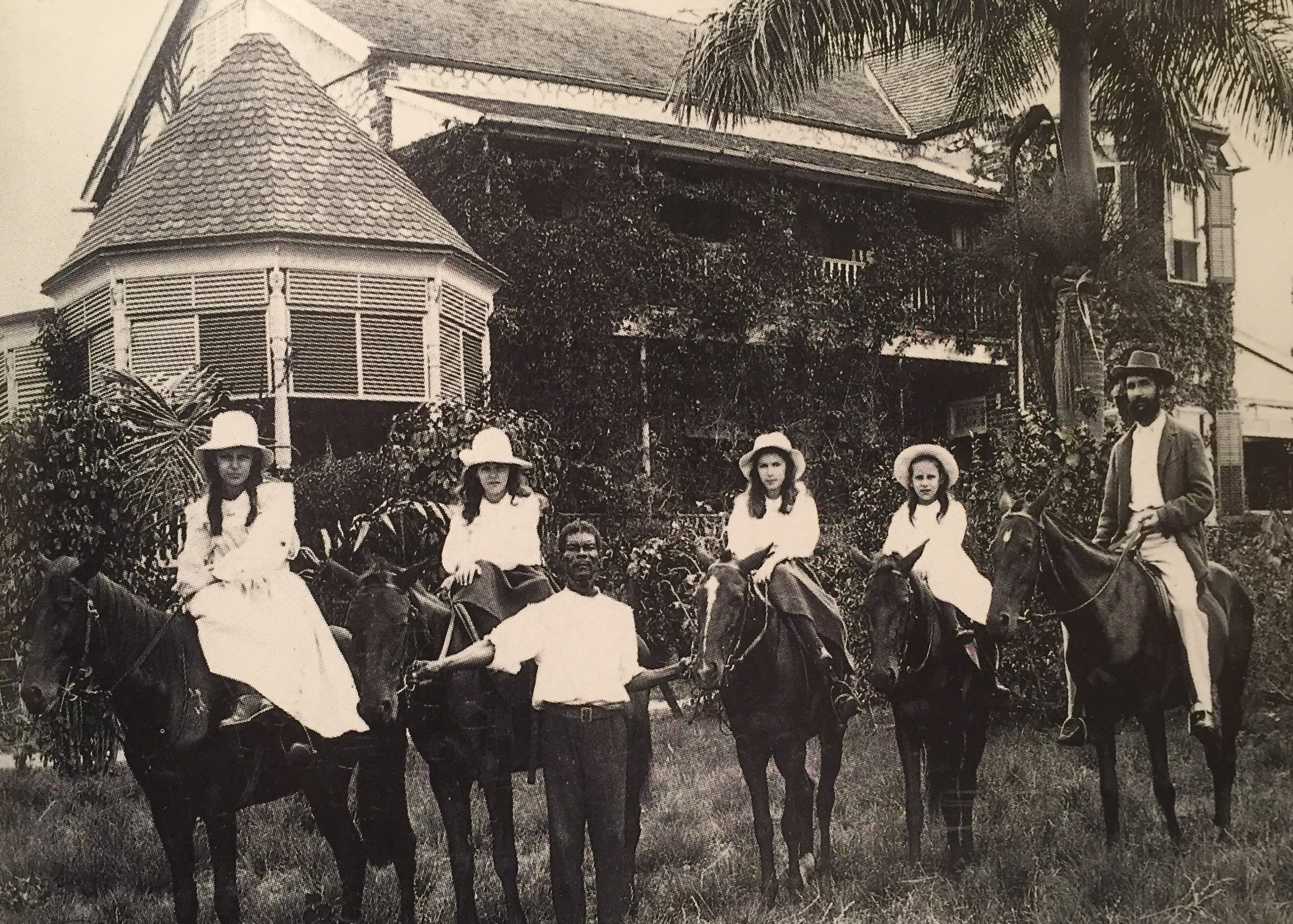
The Olivier sisters with their father, Jamaica 1903

Having caused a stir in Downing Street by voicing his opposition to the war and his criticisms of Chamberlain, Olivier was posted as Colonial Secretary in Jamaica, departing in early 1900. He again enhanced his reputation as a colonial administrator, and was acting governor later in 1900 and again in 1902. This posting ended in 1903, and Olivier returned to England, but he went back to Jamaica a short while later to work in relief and rehabilitation following a devastating hurricane, and served as acting governor for a third time. He returned to England in September 1904, and spent three years as Principal Secretary to the West Africa and West Indian Department of the Colonial Office. During this time he was again active in the Fabian Society. Feeling that the society had been stagnating since 1897, he hoped that a prominent new member, H. G. Wells, would be able to re-energise it. He supported Wells' campaign for a more radical Fabian agenda in 1906, but by the end of the year he had come to find Wells too erratic.

In 1907, following a devastating earthquake in Jamaica, Olivier returned to the colony as governor. He was appointed a KCMG, making him Sir Sydney Olivier. He quickly reestablished order after the earthquake, and his reforms of the colony's government proved to be very popular. He was responsible for the construction of the Public Buildings in downtown Kingston, in which the bureaucracy and courts were housed after the earthquake. He served in this post until 1913, then returned to England permanently, though he took very little part in Fabian activities upon his return. Moving outside of the Colonial Office, he served as Permanent Secretary to the Board of Agriculture and Fisheries for four years, then as assistant comptroller and auditor of the Exchequer from 1917 until 1920, when he retired from the civil service to devote himself to philosophical and political study. However, this proved not to be the end of his public life.

The Sydney Olivier Interscholastic Challenge Shield is the oldest and most prestigious schoolboy football title in Jamaica. The competition started in 1909, and the Shield is played between winners of the DaCosta Cup for Rural Area Champions and the Manning Cup for Urban Area Champions.

== Peer and Secretary of State for India ==
In January 1924 Olivier was appointed Secretary of State for India in the first Labour government and sworn of the Privy Council The following month he was raised to the peerage by Ramsay MacDonald as Baron Olivier, of Ramsden in the County of Oxford. His appointment as India Secretary dismayed those who had expected the office to go to Josiah Wedgwood, a supporter of the Indian independence movement. Under Olivier there was no departure from the Conservative policy on India, although Mahatma Gandhi was released from prison after serving only two years out of a six-year sentence. Olivier's attitude to Empire had changed, and he rejected calls for a new conference to discuss changes to the Montagu–Chelmsford Reforms of 1921, reaffirming the traditional argument that Britain's contribution to India gave it a right to be there and that the native Indians were not ready for self-government. Privately, he believed that the problems of India could not be solved at that time or by a minority Labour government, and resolved to merely defend the status quo.

In July 1924, he sided unsuccessfully with Wedgwood, Philip Snowden and J. H. Thomas in the Cabinet, opposing the promise of a loan to the Soviet Union, and was critical of MacDonald's decision to call an unnecessary election later that year. MacDonald did not give him an office in the Labour government of 1929, instead sending him to the West Indies to investigate the sugar trade. Following this, he retired for the final time, living in the Cotswolds and then Sussex. He had tried writing poetry during his early years but without any success. He wrote throughout his life, faring better with a few plays (first performed at the Fabian Society) and a Fabian paper on Émile Zola (1890), but was most noted for several books on colonial matters, including White Capital and Coloured Labour in 1906 and Jamaica, the Blessed Island in 1936. Having no sons, Olivier's peerage became extinct upon his death in 1943. His nephew, the actor Laurence Olivier, would be granted a life peerage in 1970 as Baron Olivier, of Brighton in East Sussex.

== Family life ==
Daughters

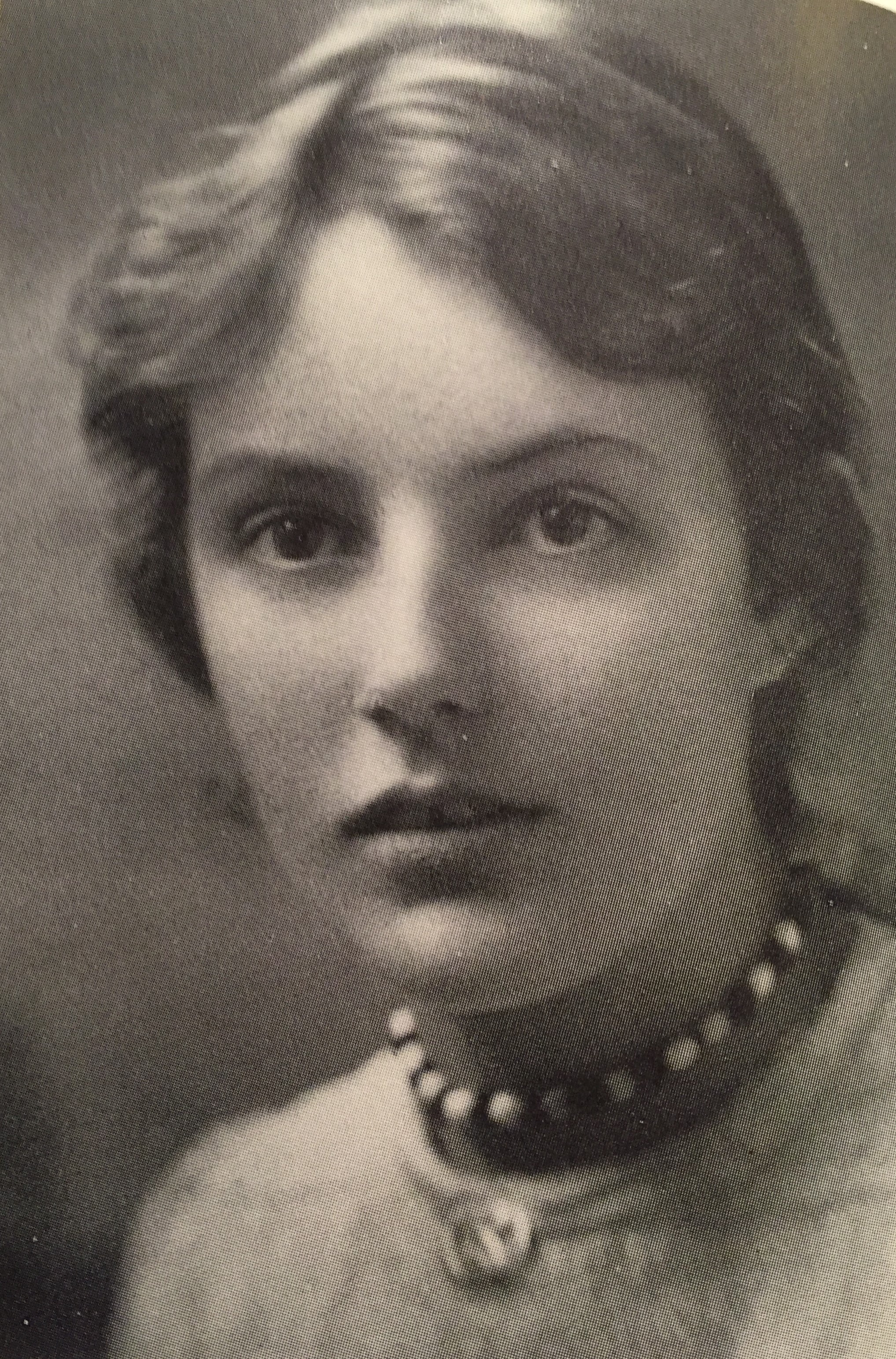
Margery Olivier 1906

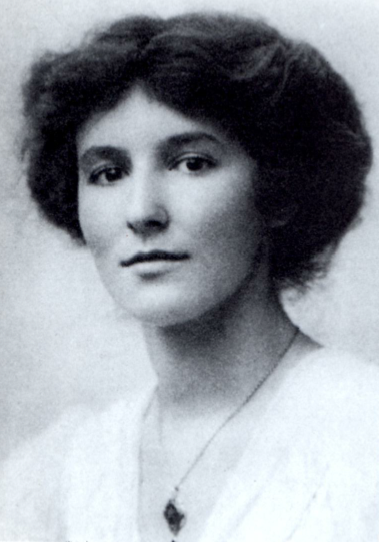
Brynhild Olivier 1913

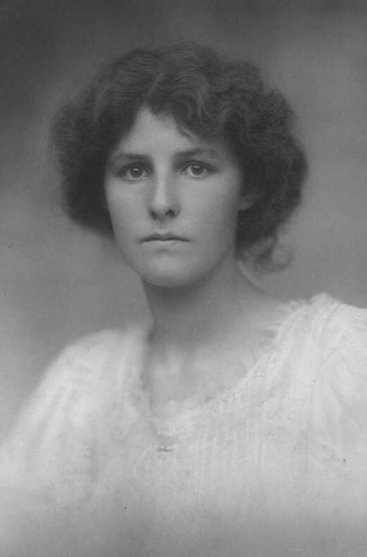
Daphne Olivier 1913

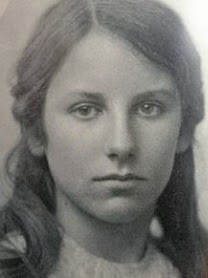
Noël Olivier 1909

Four daughters were born to the couple:

Hon. Margery Olivier (1886–1974)
Hon. Brynhild Olivier (20 May 1887 – 13 January 1935)
Hon. Daphne Olivier (1889 – 14 July 1950)
Hon. Noël Olivier (1893–1969).

They were prominent in the Cambridge and Bloomsbury social circles around Rupert Brooke and in what Virginia Woolf dubbed the Neo-Pagans.

Evelyn Louise Nicholson, née Olivier, was his sister.

After his death, his wife Margaret edited and published his letters and other writings.

== Works ==
- The League of Nations and primitive peoples – via Wikisource. (1918)

== Bibliography ==
- Darlington, W. A. (1968). Laurence Olivier. London: Morgan Grampian. ISBN 978-0-249-43970-0.
- Holden, Anthony (1988). Olivier. London: Weidenfeld and Nicolson. ISBN 978-0-297-79089-1.
- Olivier, Sydney Haldane Olivier Baron (1948). Olivier, Margaret (ed.). Sydney Olivier: Letters and Selected Writings. Preface by Bernard Shaw. Allen and Unwin.
- Williams, Stephanie (2011). Running the Show: The Extraordinary Stories of the Men who Governed the British Empire. Penguin Books Limited. ISBN 978-0-670-91808-9. (Full text on Internet Archive)
- Mariz, George (2004). "Olivier, Sydney Haldane, Baron Olivier". Oxford Dictionary of National Biography (online ed.). Oxford University Press. doi:10.1093/ref:odnb/35309. (Subscription, Wikipedia Library access or UK public library membership required.)
- Lundy, Darryl (2017). "The Peerage".
- "The London Gazette".
- Simkin, John (2016). "Sydney Olivier". History of Socialism. Spartacus Educational.

Government offices
Preceded by Sir Augustus William Lawson Hemming	Governor of Jamaica (acting); 1904	Succeeded by Hugh Clarence Bourne (acting)
Preceded by Hugh Clarence Bourne (acting)	Governor of Jamaica; 1907–1913	Succeeded by Philip Clark Cork (acting)
Preceded by Sir Thomas Elliott, 1st Baronet	Permanent Secretary of the Board of Agriculture and Fisheries; 1913–1917	Succeeded by Sir Alfred Daniel Hall
Political offices
Preceded by The Viscount Peel	Secretary of State for India; 1924	Succeeded by The Earl of Birkenhead
Peerage of the United Kingdom
New creation	Baron Olivier; 1924–1943	Extinct
