= Edith Pye =

Midwife and international relief organizer (1876–1965)

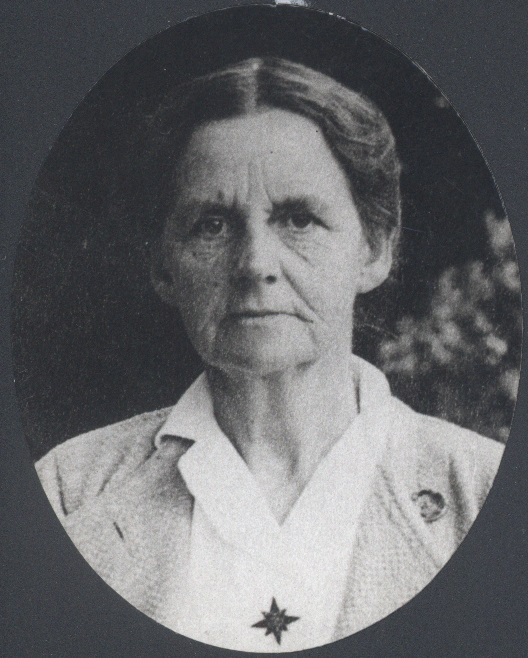
- Born: 20 October 1876; London, United Kingdom
- Died: 16 December 1965 (aged 89); Somerset, United Kingdom
- Occupations: Midwife and International Relief Organizer
- Relatives: Sybil Pye (sister), Ethel Pye (sister), David Randall Pye (brother); William Pye (nephew), David Pye (nephew)

Signature
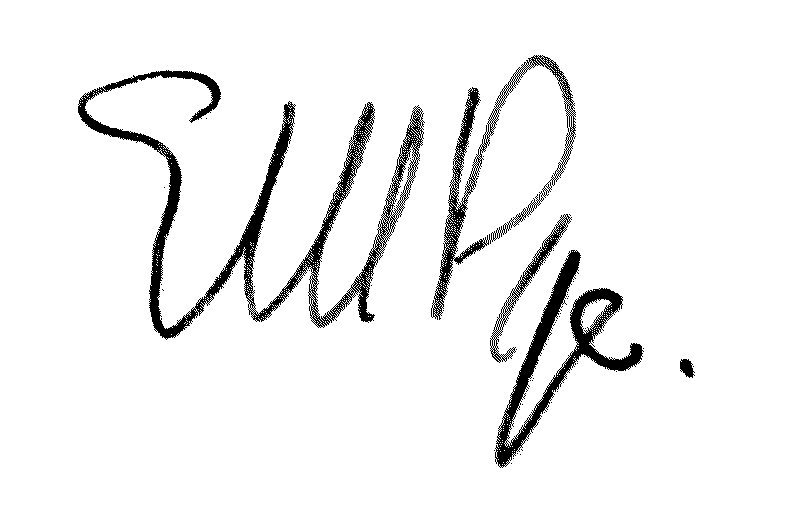

Edith Mary Pye (20 October 1876 – 16 December 1965) was an English midwife and International Relief Organizer. She worked as a nurse and midwife in maternity hospitals for women refugees and was the president of the British Midwives Institute (now Royal College of Midwives) for 20 years. Along with being a member of Friends Germany Emergency Committee, Red Cross, and the International Commission for the Assistance of Child Refugees in 1907, she became Superintendent of District Nurses in London. Following her lengthy career in international relief efforts and as a midwife, she died at her home in Somerset in 1965.

== Early life ==
She was born on 20 October 1876 in London, to William Arthur Pye JP, a wine merchant, and Margaret Thompson Kidston, daughter of James Burns Kidston of Glasgow. Edith was the eldest of eight children including Sybil Pye, the bookbinder, the artist Ethel Pye and David Randall Pye, the scientist and father of the sculptor William Pye. Ethel and Sybil belonged to a circle of friends of Rupert Brooke, known as the Neo-pagans.

== Career ==
Edith Pye became a registered midwife in 1906 from Clapham School of Midwifery under the leadership of Dr. Annie McCall. She trained as a nurse at the David Lewis Northern Hospital and by 1907 she became Central Superintendent of the Raynard District Nurses in London. She became a member of the Society of Friends (Quakers) in 1908 through her connections with her friend and lifelong partner, Dr Hilda Clark, a physician and humanitarian aid worker.

In December 1914, Pye and Clark worked through the Friends War Victim Relief Committee, an official branch of the British Quakers, at Chalons-sur-Marne, France to help women and children of war victims. They focused on establishing maternity hospitals for women refugees and convalescent homes for sick women and children. In 1919 Pye was awarded the Legion d'honneur, a high honor in France, for her efforts rescuing children from the bombings. Later in 1919, Pye and Clark traveled to Vienna to provide medical aid to malnourished and refugee children affected by the famine.

In 1923, she traveled alongside Camille Drevet to China, French Indochina, and Japan to continue relief work in association with the Women's International League. This trip was brought about by WILPF's stance against imperialism of any kind and the desire to establish closer contact with women in the East. Initially the women were suspected of being anticolonial agents and were closely watched by the male French colonists of Indochina. However, feminism and women's emancipation became the focal point of controversy surrounding their trip. Many of Pye's public lectures were focused on women's emancipation in the concept of tradition and domesticity. The Vietnamese Constitutionalists, who had originally arranged for the trip, saw both ladies as a threat to the traditional family structure due to their unmarried independent lifestyle.

In 1929, Pye became the President of the British Midwives' Institute, where she witnessed the formation of the Joint Council of Midwifery, the passing of the Midwives Act of 1936 and the introduction of the National Health Service during her 20 years of service. By 1932 Pye was serving as a member of the WILPF executive committee, and later served as the British representative on the International Executive Committee for the WILPF. The members of the Women's International League, the British branch of the WILPF, were devoted towards specific political issues rather than strong partisan devotion. This devotion led to a wide variety of partisan parties among members, from Socialist to Quaker beliefs. Rather than leading to division, this led to a more unified and diverse perspective on reform in this era. In addition, she was the president of the International Confederation of Midwives from 1934 until 1936.

During the 1930's, she organized the Friends' work from the Spanish Civil War and was involved with the International Commission for the Assistance of Child Refugees and the Women's International League for Peace and Freedom. In 1939, while working through the International Commission to provide humanitarian assistance for Spanish refugees in France, Pye created a new organization to specifically aid Spanish refugee children. This new committee, the Commission d'Aide aux Enfants Espagnols Réfugiés en France (CAEERF), was managed exclusively by a network of women from different backgrounds. Although they were focused in a number of humanitarian efforts, they primarily focused on family reunification and legal repatriation. This organization operated from February 1939 until June 1940, due to the German occupation of France.

During World War II, she supported the lifting of the allied blockade in an effort to allow food and medical supplies to be sent to starving people in Europe. She was a leading member of the Famine Relief Committee and she lobbied the Ministry of Economic Warfare. Between 1941 and 1955 she worked in both France and Greece while continuing her efforts for peace and war relief.

== Death ==
In 1952 Pye retired to her home in Somerset with Hilda Clark, who was struggling with Parkinson's Disease. She died at her home at 4 Overleigh, Street, Somerset on 16 December 1965, ten years after her lifelong partner Clark. She was buried under the same headstone as Hilda Clark at the Quaker burial ground in Street, Somerset.

== Bibliography ==
- Oldfield, Sybil (2004). "Pye, Edith Mary". Oxford Dictionary of National Biography (online ed.). Oxford University Press. doi:10.1093/ref:odnb/37871. (Subscription, Wikipedia Library access or UK public library membership required.)
