= Freda Skinner =

British sculptor and woodcarver

Freda Nellie Skinner (31 January 1911 – 19 July 1993) was a British sculptor and woodcarver who was head of sculpture at Wimbledon School of Art from 1945 to 1971.

Skinner was born in Warlingham, Surrey, where her father, Norman, had a farm; she showed an early interest in art at age 11 with a pair of paintings of a prized Champion Devon Red bull and a cow. She studied under Henry Moore and Alan Durst at The Royal College of Art, her course fees being met, in part, by neighbours including Ethel and Sybil Pye. She then went on to teach toy making and sculpture at Kingston School of Art, and was head of sculpture at Wimbledon School of Art 1945 to 1971.

She was a Fellow of the Royal Society of British Sculptors and a member of the Society of Portrait Sculptors.

Her 1972 sculpture Virgin and Child is in the Lady Chapel of St Elphege's Church, Wallington, south London. She also carved the foundation stone for the Barbican Art Centre in central London, in 1972. She exhibited at the Royal Academy Summer Exhibition six times, and also at the Architects Association, Holland Park Orangery, Mall Galleries, The London Group, Suffolk Galleries, Bruton Street Gallery and Wykeham Galleries.

In 1993 there was a retrospective exhibition of her work at the Bruton Street Gallery in central London. Two of her jigsaw works for Abbatt Toys are held in the V&A.

In 1944 she was recorded living at The Ivy House, French Street, Sunbury-on-Thames, then at 35 and later 79 Deodar Road, Putney, from the late 1940s to about 1981. She moved to Amesbury in Wiltshire in 1981 and died in West Amesbury, Wiltshire on 19 July 1993.

== Gallery ==
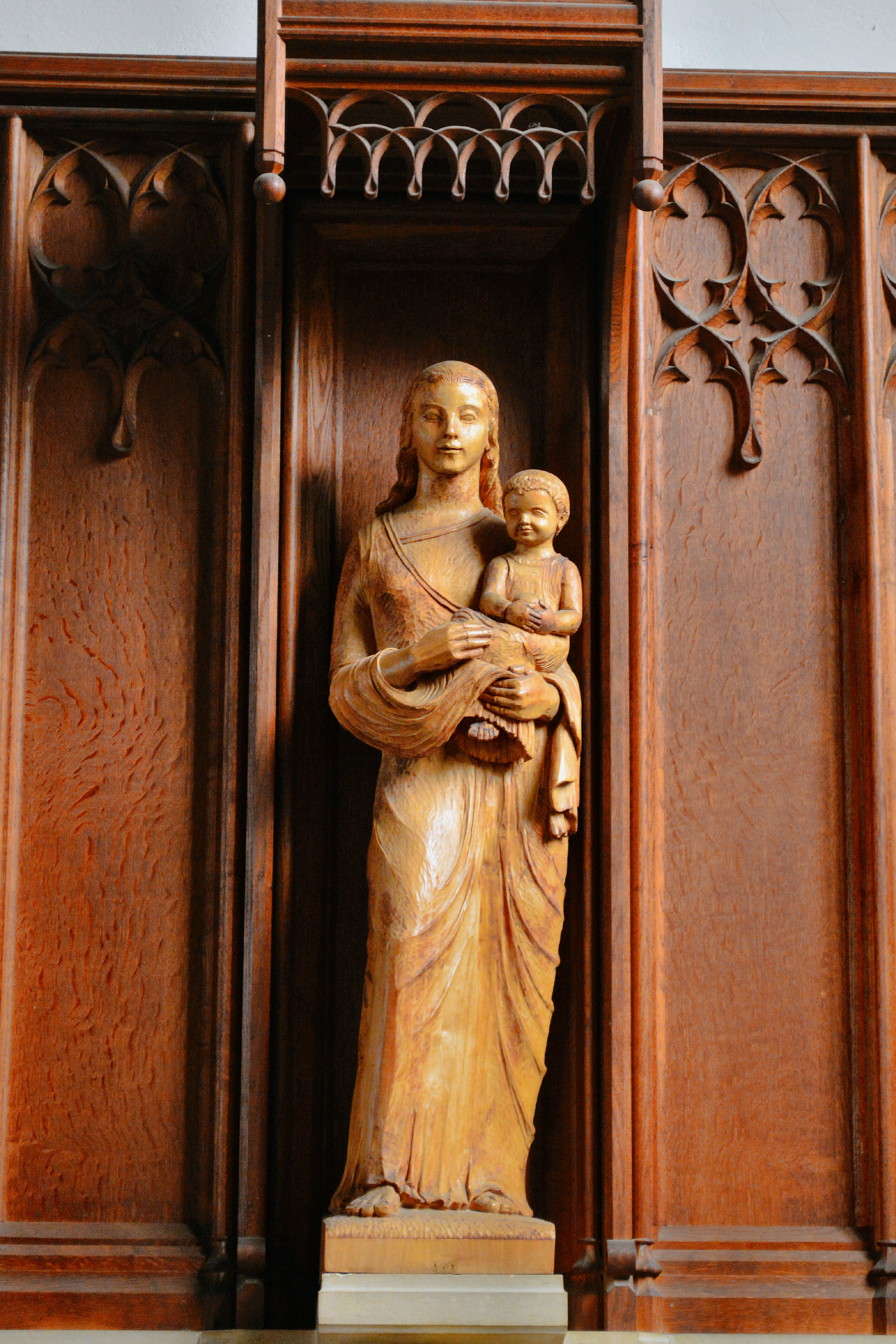
Madonna and Child

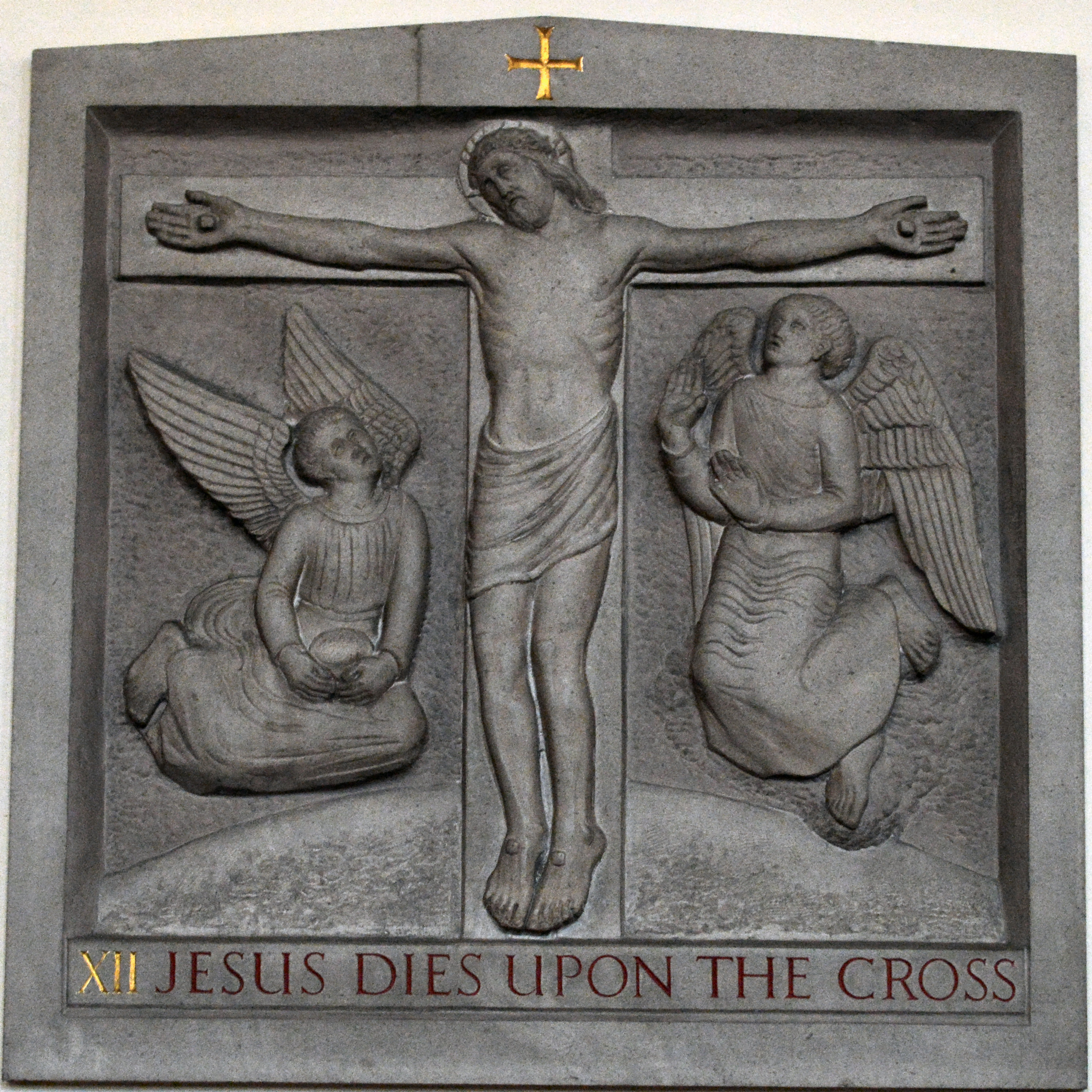
Stations of the Cross XII, St John the Divine

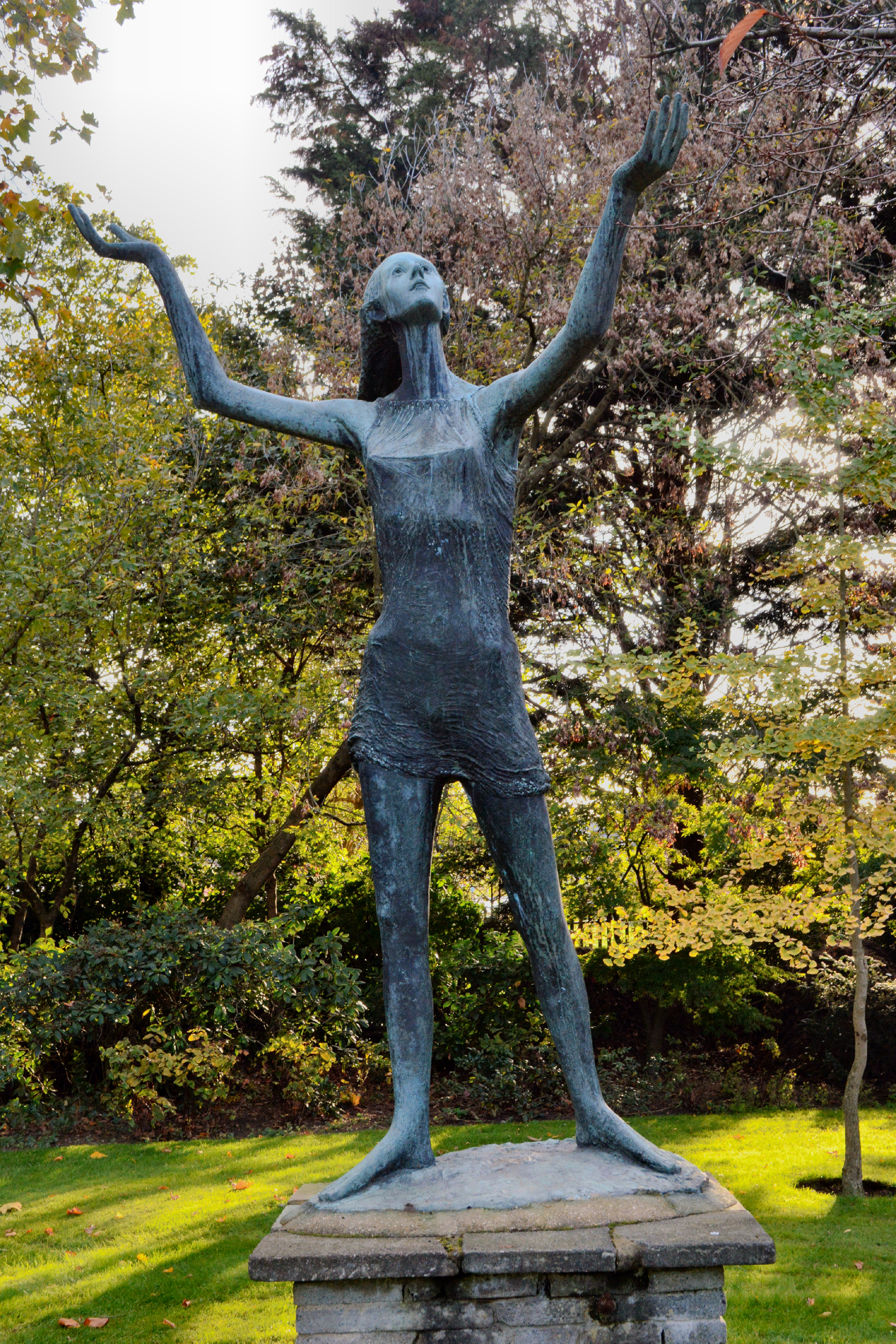
The Spirit of Youth

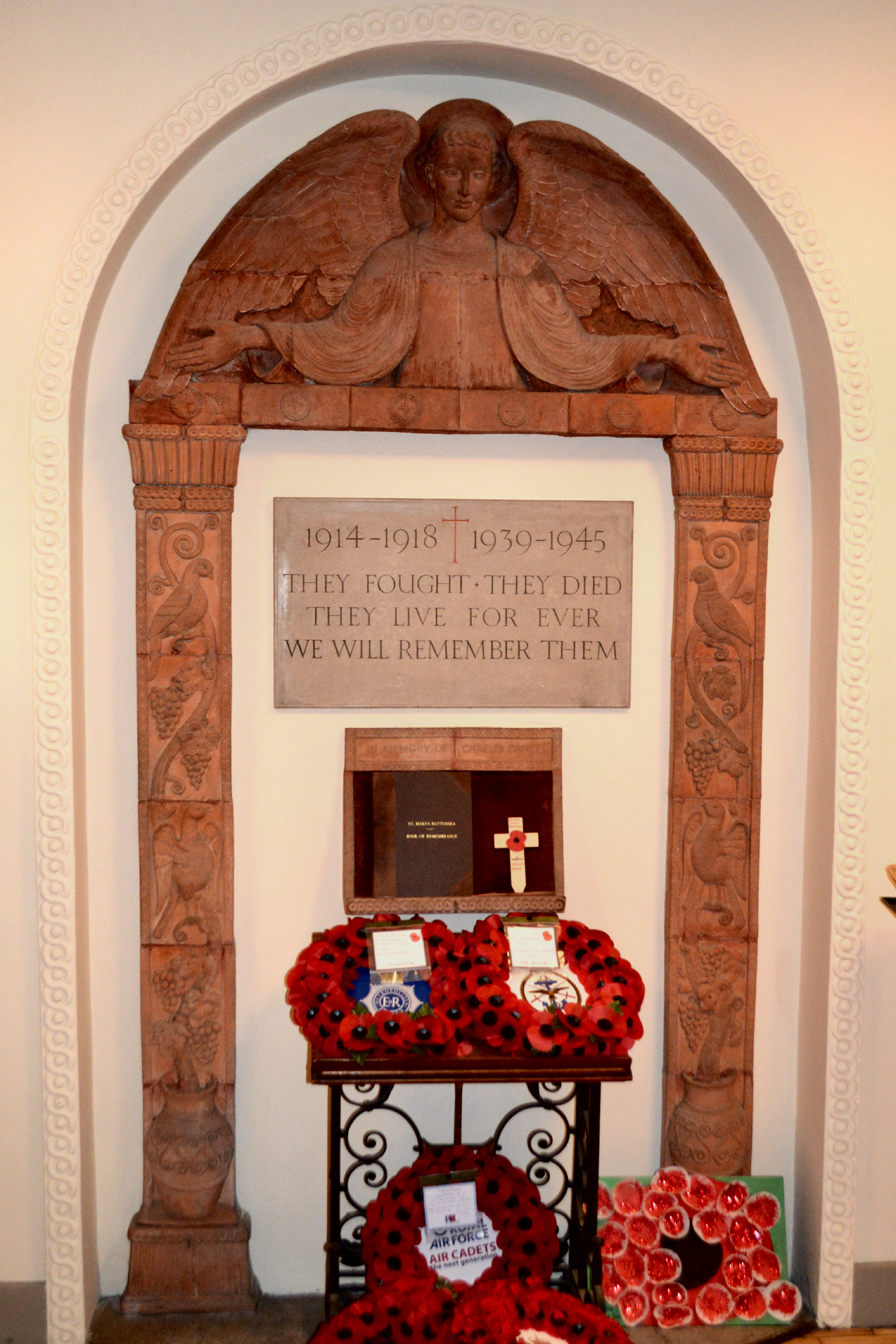
War memorial, Battersea

== Works exhibited at the Royal Academy ==
Year	Title	Type
1938	Horse	Bronze statue
1944	A Berthel, Esq.	Head, terra-cotta
1951	Jana	Bust, terra-cotta
1952	Marianna	Head, Bronze
1960	Mrs Hoffman	Head, ciment fondu
1963	Child with an apple	Half-figure, concrete
1967	Horse	Bronze
1989	Harlequin	Bronze (edition of 10)

== Selected works ==
Image	Type	Location	Date	Note
	Madonna and Child	St Thomas More Church, Dulwich	1933	
	War Memorial	St Mary's Church, Battersea	1949	
	Rood Cross	St Francis of Assisi Church, Isleworth	1957	
	Stations of the Cross	St John the Divine, Richmond	1955–1970	
	The Risen Christ in Glory	St Paul's Church, Lorrimore Square	1960	
	The Spirit of Youth	Roundwood Park, Willesden Originally installed in 1966 outside the new indoor pool at Willesden Lido.	1966	
	Virgin and Child	St Elphege's Church, Wallington, London	1972	
	Foundation Stone	Barbican Arts Centre	1972	
	Plaque and Coat of Arms	Barbican Arts Centre foyer	1982	
	Cromwell Debates	St Mary's Church, Putney	1982	

== Bibliography ==
- Woodcarving (1961) New York: Sterling Pub. Co ISBN 1163825581
