= Ethel Pye =

British sculptor and jewellery designer (1882–1955 or 1960)

Margaret Ethel Pye
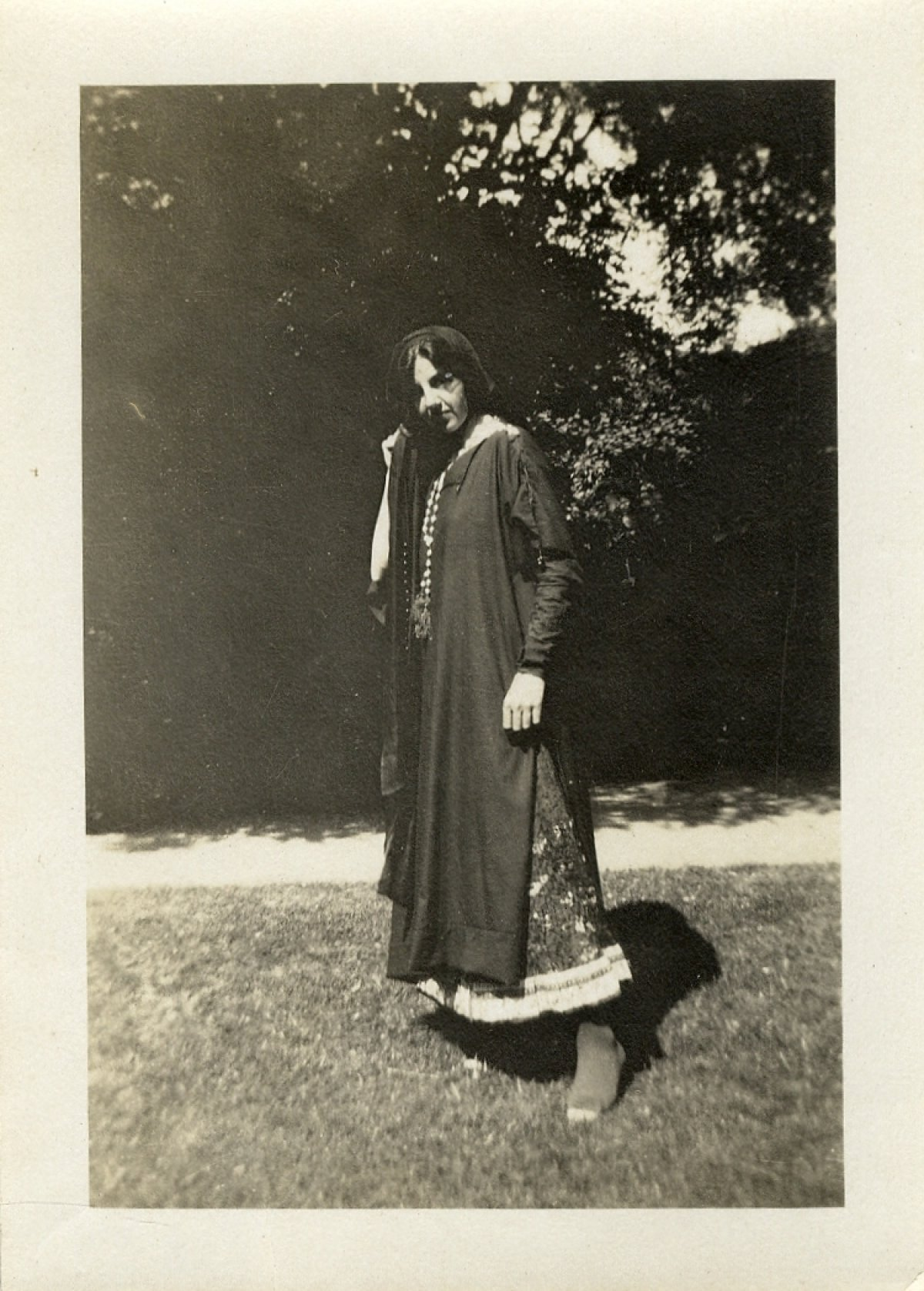
- Pye as Lechery in Doctor Faustus
- Born: 1882
- Died: 1960 (aged 77–78)
- Education: Slade School of Fine Art
- Style: Sculpture
- Relatives: Sybil Pye (sister); Edith Pye (sister); David Randall Pye (brother)

Margaret Ethel Pye (1882–1960) (Note: The literature is uncertain about her date of death. The British Museum specifies "1960?" and the Mapping Sculpture database, "1960 (presumed)". Familysearch.com has 1891 and 1911 census returns recording Pye's name as Margaret Ethel; and a record of the death of one Margaret Ethel Pye at Cuckfield, Sussex, in 1955. A probate record for her sister, Anna Sybella, following her death in 1958, shows her leaving all assets to David Pye. (See Talk:Ethel Pye.) The possibility is that Ethel predeceased her sister at Cuckfield Hospital, local to their shared home, Hill Cottage in Newick, in 1955, rather than dying in 1960.) was a British sculptor who worked in bronze and wood. In the 1910s she also created jewellery, of which some examples still remain. She was a member of a group of literary and artistic friends nicknamed by Virginia Woolf the "neo-pagans".

== Biography ==
Margaret Ethel Pye was one of seven children (four brothers and two sisters) born to Margaret Thompson Kidston, daughter of James Burns Kidston of Glasgow, and William Arthur Pye JP from Exeter, a successful wine merchant and collector of oriental and contemporary art. She was the sister of the bookbinder Sybil Pye, the nurse Edith Pye and the engineer David Randall Pye. The family lived at Marylebone in London, where Ethel Pye grew up, before the family moved to Hampstead, then Surrey.

Ethel Pye studied at the Slade School of Fine Art in central London and then exhibited at the Royal Scottish Academy in 1910 and with the Society of Women Artists on a regular basis from 1949 onwards. She was elected an Associate of the Society of Women Artists in 1950. Both Sybil and Ethel Pye attended the classes of Thomas Sturge Moore. Later Ethel Pye told Sturge Moore's wife, Marie Appia, that her sculptures "did not exist" until Sturge Moore had seen them; she also created costumes and masks based on Sturge Moore's designs for staging of his verse-plays. The family lived at Priest Hill, near the Olivier sisters (with whom Ethel and Sybil Pye became friends) in Limpsfield.

Together with Rupert Brooke, who corresponded with her for many years, she was part of a group nicknamed by Virginia Woolf the "neo-pagans"; a number of whom remark on Pye in their writings.

Photo of a painting by Ethel Pye from 1910, of a "neo-pagan" camp on the Beaulieu River in 1910, depicting Harold Hobson (fetching wood), Hugh Popham (on boat), Ka Cox, Brynhild Olivier, Dudley Ward and Rupert Brooke

In August 1910 she was part of a camping expedition near Buckler's Hard on the Beaulieu River; other people included were Rupert Brooke, Noël Olivier and Brynhild Olivier, Jacques Raverat, Katherine Laird Cox, Helton Godwin Baynes, Harold Hobson, Arthur E. Popham, Francis William Hubback and Eva Spielman, Sybil Pye, David Pye and David "Bunny" Garnett. Ethel Pye wrote to Noël Olivier, "I have been gazing at June, July, and August, wondering if I shall be able to put down something really epoch-making like [...] this year." Ethel Pye created a painting of this event, which A. E. Popham described:

On the extreme left the boat comes to her muddy mornings and I am seen unshipping the rudder, then Harold (Hobson) is seen grumbling on his way to fetch wood, then the big tent and Ka and you cooking, then Dudley (Ward) and the Financial Times and Rupert and all.

In 1910, Rupert Brooke gave a notorious breakfast (appearing in various diaries of who attended) at his home, The Orchard; the 12 participants included: Dudley Ward; Geoffrey Keynes; Bill Hubback, Archie Campbell, Jacques Raverat, Bryn Olivier, Ethel Pye and Dorothy Osmaston. On Monday, 8 February 1926, Virginia Woolf wrote in her diary that she received "a card, showing me her character in an unfavourable light from Miss Ethel Pye, who once met me in an omnibus and wishes to take a mask of my head."

During World War I she visited her sister's Friends War Victim Relief hospital in Chalons-sur-Marne in 1917, later making a bronze, Marne 1914-1919, which is now held in the Library of the Society of Friends in London.

Together with her sister Sybil, Ethel Pye was part of a group - including Sturge Moore and Laurence Binyon - which established the (London) Literary Theatre Club, modelled after the Irish Literary Theatre of W. B. Yeats & Lady Gregory, the participants in which were mainly young women like Isabel Fry, Eleanor Calhoun, Gwendolyn Bishop, and Mona Wilson.

Ethel and Sybil Pye helped to fund Freda Skinner's attendance at the Royal College of Art from about 1928.

When Pye's father died in 1933, Ethel and Sybil Pye moved to Newick in East Sussex to be close to one of their brothers. Neither of them married and both lived and worked together all their lives.

Her nephew, the sculptor William Pye, acknowledges being inspired by his aunt Ethel from the age of 10; and after the death of David Pye, William's father, in 1960, when William was 21, she became a key influence on him. Another nephew, design and handcraft academic and practitioner David Pye, donated some of her drawings to the British Museum.

== Exhibitions ==
Pye's body of work is poorly documented, but she is known to have exhibited at:

- 1909 exhibition of the International Society of Sculptors, Painters and Gravers - "a newcomer, Miss Ethel Pye, shows remarkable promise by the energy and imaginative feeling of two bronzes of classic subjects"
- 1913 exhibition of the International Society of Sculptors, Painters and Gravers
- 1932 Women's International Art Club exhibition
- 1949 Kensington Art Gallery
