= Sybil Pye =

British bookbinder (1879–1958)

- Born: 18 November 1879; Marylebone, London
- Died: 1958 (aged 78 or 79)
- Known for: Bookbinding
- Relatives: Edith Pye (sister), Ethel Pye (sister), David Randall Pye (brother), William Pye (nephew), David Pye (nephew)

Sybil Pye (18 November 1879 – 1958) was a self-trained British bookbinder famous for her distinctive inlay Art Deco leather bindings. She was, along with Katharine Adams and Sarah Prideaux, one of the most famous women bookbinders of their period. She was the only binder in England and one of a few in the world whose specialty was inlaid leather bindings.

== Life ==
Pye was born Anna Sybella Pye in Marylebone, an area of London, England, and a member of a distinguished family. She was one of seven children (four brothers and two sisters) born to Margaret Thompson Thompson Kidston, daughter of James Burns Kidston of Glasgow and William Arthur Pye JP, a successful wine merchant and collector of oriental and contemporary art. They lived in Limpsfield, Surrey, in a house called Priest Hill. Their neighbours included a number of progressive families including Sydney and Margaret Olivier and Edward and Constance Garnett and all their children became friends. Their parents entertained many literary and artistic figures of the time including Laurence Binyon and Thomas Sturge Moore.

The oldest sister was Edith Mary Pye and one of the few women Chevaliers of the Legion of Honour for her work in France during World War I. and the youngest was the artist turned sculptor, Ethel Pye (ca. 1882–1960), who was educated at the Slade School and worked in bronze and wood. (Note: Edith and Ethel were Quakers, and during the First World War worked for the Friends War Victims Relief Committee (FWVRC) at Châlons-sur-Marne, France (Maison Maternelle de la Marne). Ethel commemorated her time there in a small bronze sculpture titled Marne 1914-1919, which is in the Society of Friends reading room.) Her brothers included David Randall Pye, the scientist and father of the sculptor William Pye, and Edmund Burns Pye (1878–1959), father of David Pye, an accomplished wood-turner and carver, theorist of design and handcraft, and Professor of Furniture Design at The Royal College of Art (RCA) in London. He donated Sybil's papers to the RCA.

Sybil was in poor health in her childhood and her first job was as a teacher in a private kindergarten. Ethel and Sybil belonged to a circle of friends of Rupert Brooke, known as the Neo-pagans, which included the Olivier sisters and David Garnett. When their father died in 1933, the sisters moved to Newick, Sussex, to be close to one of their brothers. Neither of them married and both lived and worked together all their lives, although Moore proposed to her and wrote the poems of The Little School (1905) for her. She died in 1958 at the age of 79.

== Work ==
She first met Thomas Sturge Moore in 1899 and she developed a close life-long friendship. After Moore introduced her to Charles Ricketts, the artist and book designer, she developed an interest in bookbinding. She taught herself, learning from Douglas Cockerell's classic Bookbinding and the Care of Books, but also used Moore and Ricketts as advisors and critics throughout her career. By 1906 she had produced her first binding after establishing a workshop in her father's house. Early bindings were in white or natural pigskin but she increasingly used coloured goatskin leather inlays and by 1934 bound a book with six different colored inlays.

In 1925 she made a record of the books she had bound and kept it up until 1955. From 1910 to 1946 her work was regularly exhibited in England and around the world. In 1931, the book collector John Roland Abbey commissioned her to produce a binding of his own design for Siegfried Sassoon's Memoirs of an Infantry Officer. In her lifetime, she completed an estimated 164 bindings. Towards the end of her binding career, the quality of her work suffered due to an injury to her wrist that never healed properly. Sybil was one of the youngest of the pre-War women binders.

== Legacy ==
Pye's bindings are held by private collectors and collecting institutions alike.

- Boston Athenaeum in Boston, Massachusetts
- J.P. Getty Library at Wormsley in Buckinghamshire, England
- Fitzwilliam Museum in Cambridge, England
- The Anthony Dowd Collection of Modern Bindings, Manchester, England
- University of Manchester Library
- About the Collection. Duke University's Rubenstein Rare Book Library's Lisa Unger Baskin Collection

== Bibliography ==
- Pankow, David, ed. (2002). "Marianne Tidcombe: Women Bookbinders in Britain before the First World War". Proceedings: A Collection of Papers from the June 2000 Conference Celebrating the Installation and Opening of the Bernard C. Middleton Collection of Books on the History and Practice of Bookbinding. Melbert B. Cary, jr. Graphics Arts Collection, Wallace Library, Rochester Institute of Technology. pp. 53–70. ISBN 978-0-9713459-2-8.
- Saunders, O. A. (1961). "David Randall Pye. 1886-1960". Biographical Memoirs of Fellows of the Royal Society. 7: 199–205. doi:10.1098/rsbm.1961.0015. JSTOR 769406. S2CID 73367463.
- "Ethel Pye". Mapping the practice and profession of sculpture in Britain and Ireland 1851–1951. Glasgow University, the Victoria and Albert Museum and the Henry Moore Institute. 2018.
- British Museum (2017). "Ethel Pye".
- Society of Friends (28 November 2014). "Library resources for researching World War I: visual resources". Quaker Strongrooms.
- Oldfield, Sybil (2004). "Pye, Edith Mary". Oxford Dictionary of National Biography (online ed.). Oxford University Press. doi:10.1093/ref:odnb/37871. (Subscription, Wikipedia Library access or UK public library membership required.)
- Tidcombe, Marianne, Women Bookbinders, 1880-1920 (1996)
- Cockerell, Douglas, Bookbinding and the Care of Books (1910).
- Benton, Charlotte; Benton, Tim; Wood, Ghislaine eds, Art Deco 1910-1939 (2003).
- Magg Bros, Bookbinding in the British Isles: Sixteenth to the Twentieth Century (1996).
- Marks, P.J.M., Beautiful Bindings: A Thousand Years of the Bookbinder's Art (2011).
