= Deodar Road =

Street in Putney

Coordinates: 51.46401°N 0.20977°W

Deodar Road is a street in Putney, in the London Borough of Wandsworth. There are no other streets named Deodar Road in Great Britain. It was formerly the site of a mansion called The Cedars and a terrace of houses built in 1853. This was on the site of Copthall, a villa rebuilt in the 1620s. Next to this was a mansion, Putney House, built in the 1680s; it was converted into a College for Civil Engineers in 1839 and demolished in 1857. When the railway and bridge crossing the Thames was built (1887-9) by The London and South West Railway it more or less went straight through the terrace of houses. The area fell into decline and the Cedars was demolished about 1890. The road was named after The Cedars; the Himalayan cedar, Cedrus deodara. It was previously called Ranelagh Road. The odd numbered houses back on to the river.

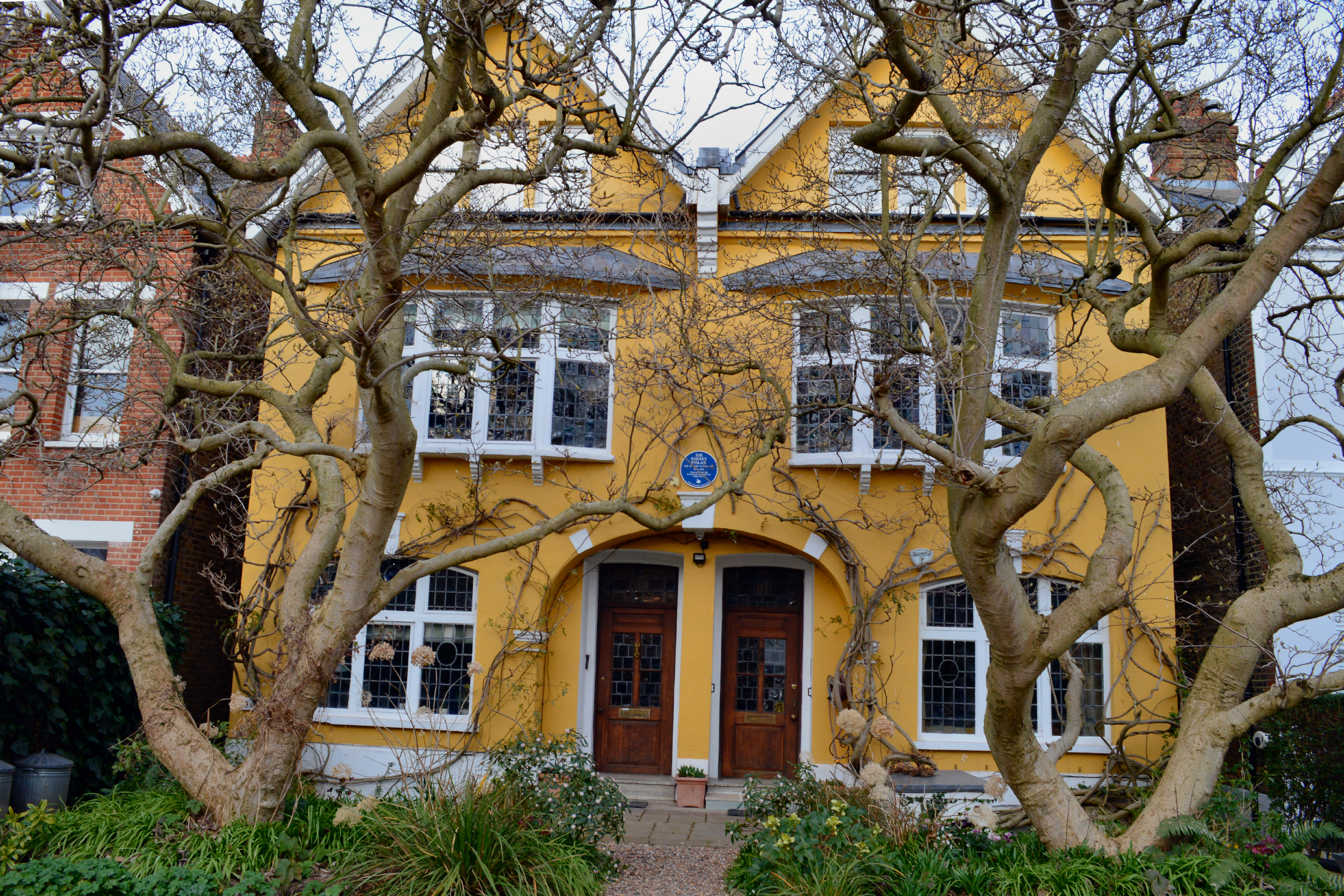
79 Deodar Road

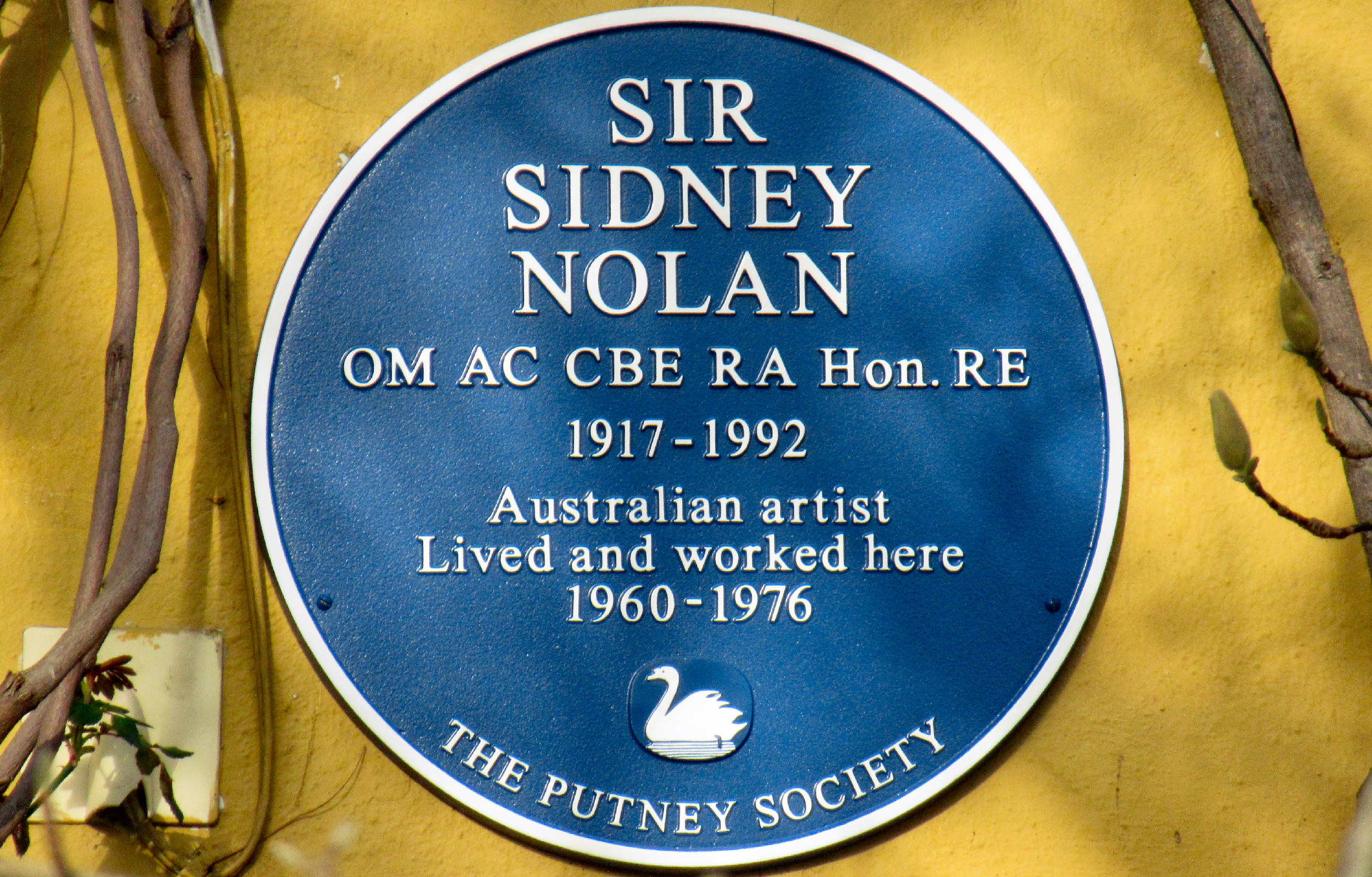
Blue plaque

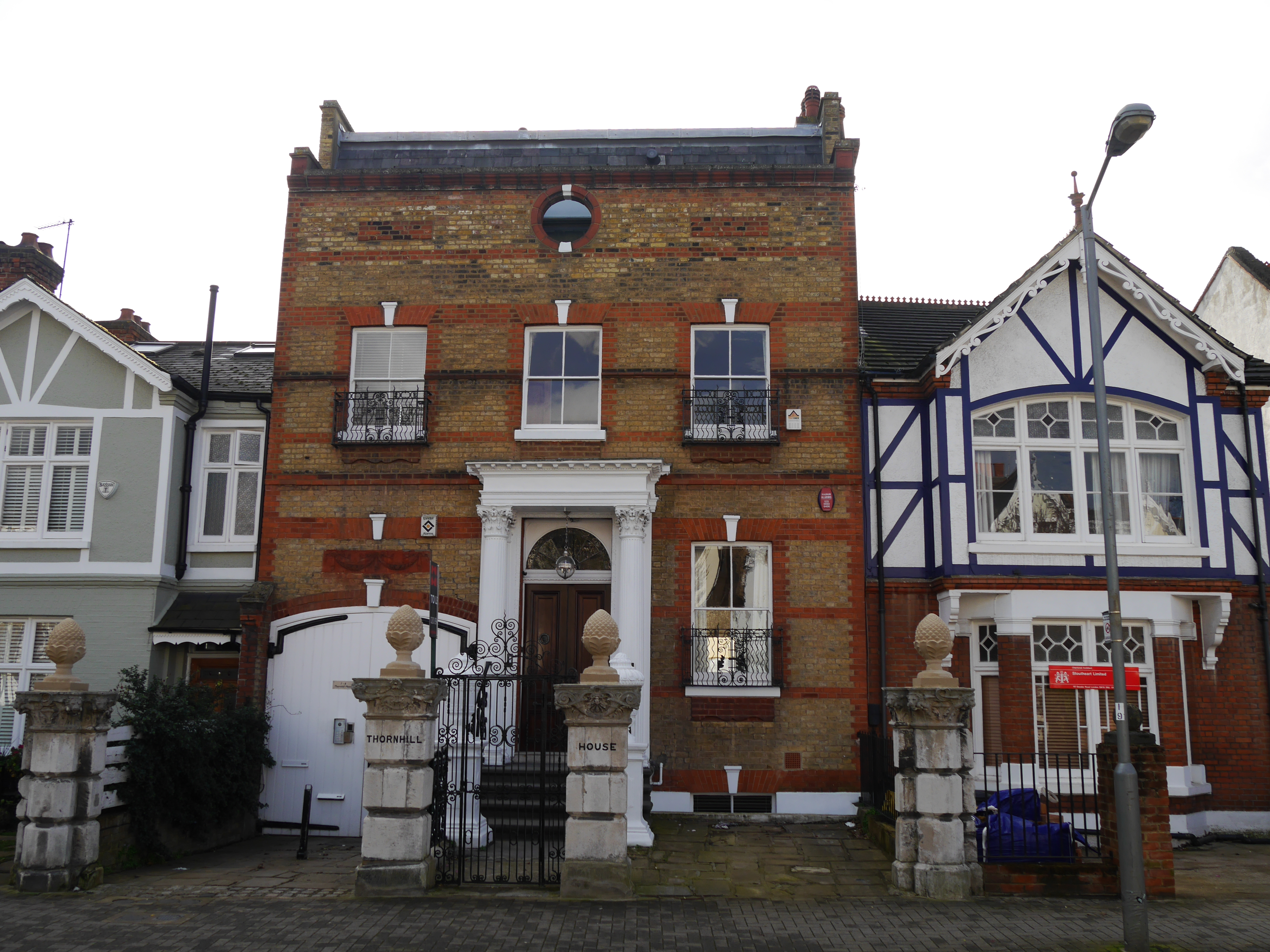
Thornhill House

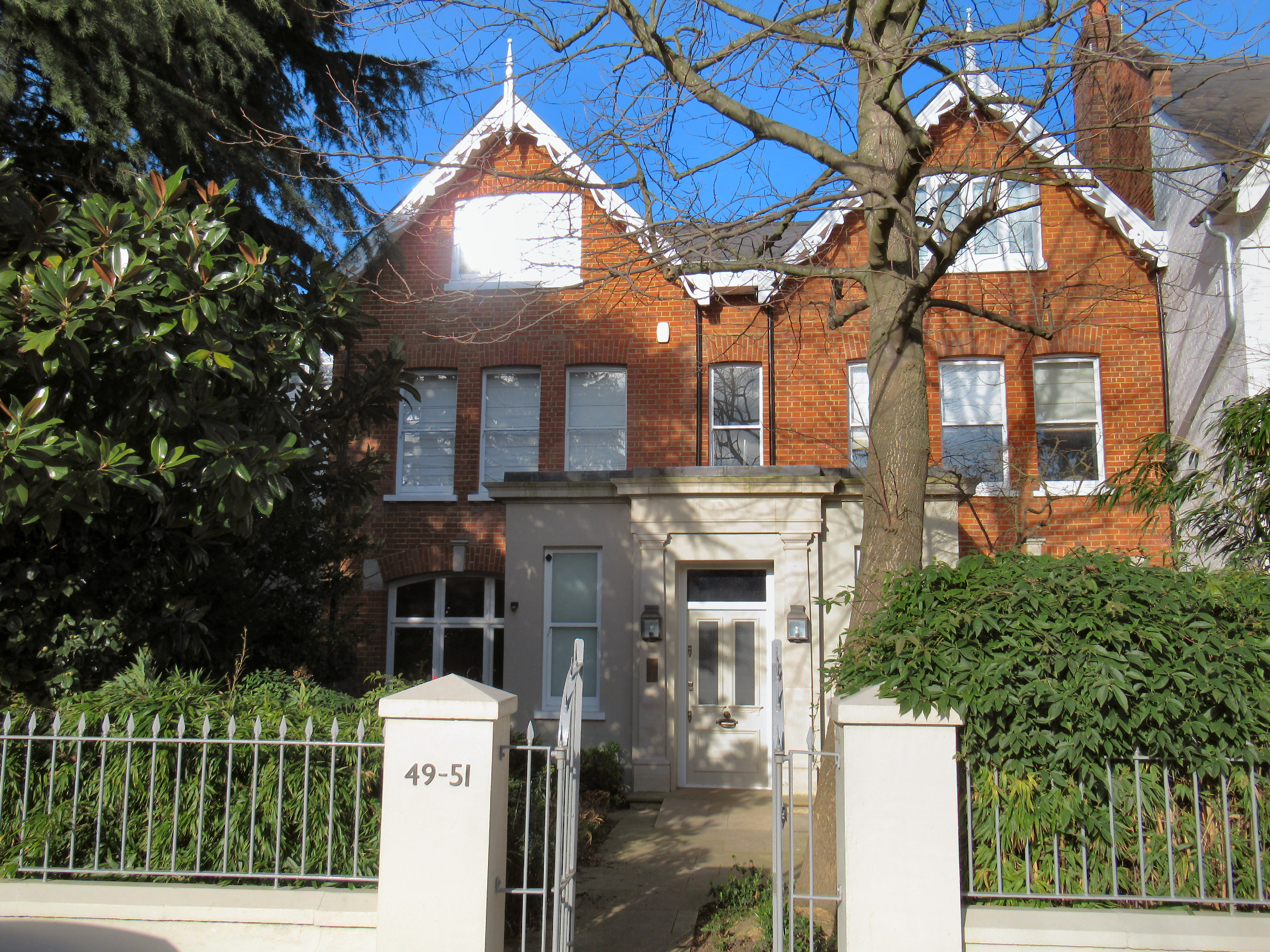
49-51 Deodar Road

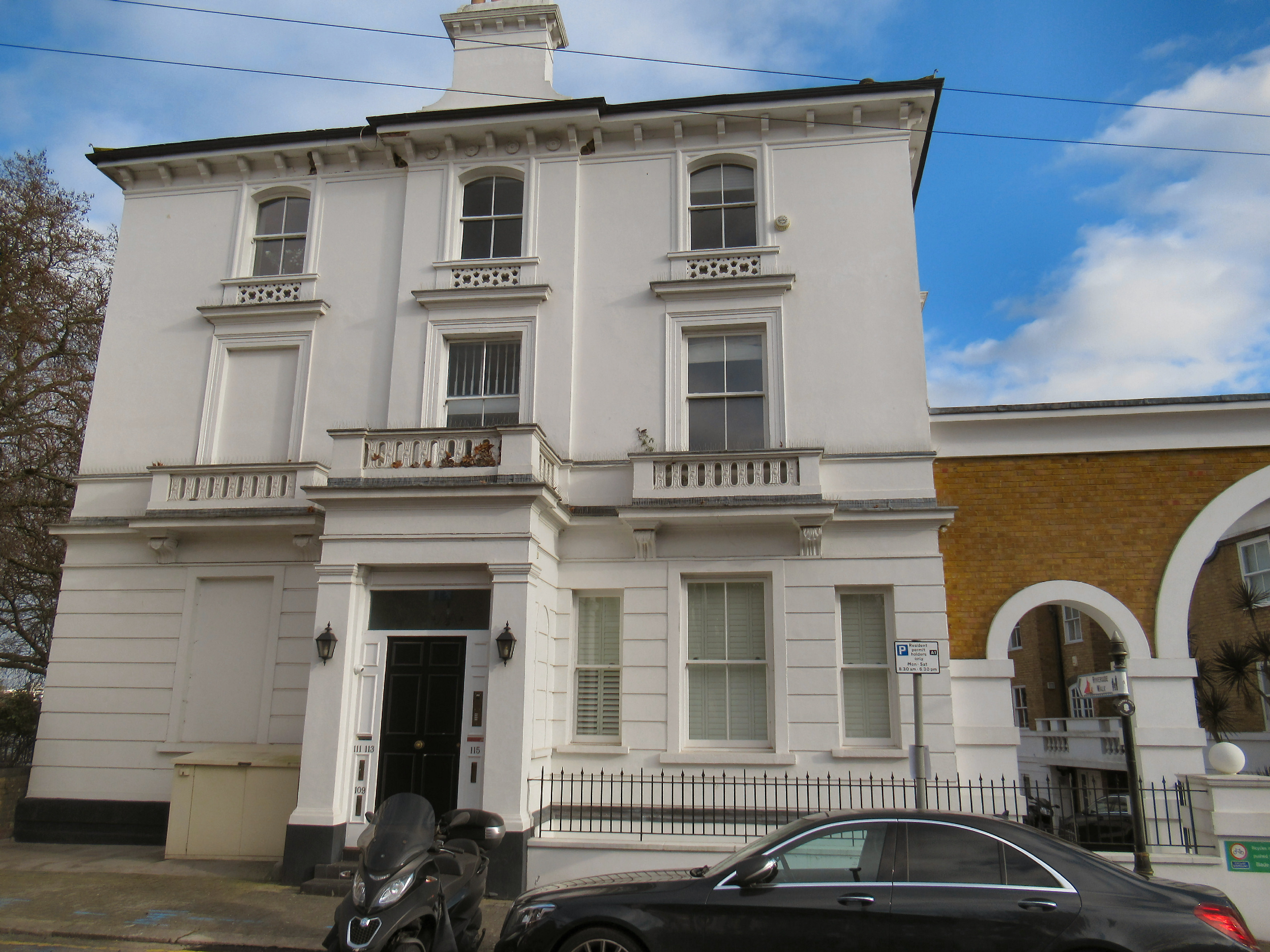
Riverdale House

== Notable buildings and residents ==
Number 78, Thornhill House, is Grade II listed. It was built about 1890 by the Kensington builder, Mr Wakefield, who incorporated fine panelling, staircase and wall-paintings from Wandsworth Manor, which dated from the late 17th century, and was demolished in 1890. Some panelling and flooring is thought to have come from the Tivoli Theatre of Varieties on the Strand, London, which was demolished in 1916. Other internal decorations were added by his grandson, Norris, who had worked with Edward James in the 1930s at Monkton House, West Dean in Sussex. It contains murals by the artist Sir James Thornhill.

Number 79 has a blue plaque to commemorate Sir Sidney Nolan OM AC CBE RA, (1917-1992), one of Australia's leading artists of the 20th century, who lived here from 1960 to 1979. The ashes of his wife, Cynthia Reed Nolan, (1908–1976), an Australian writer and gallerist, are buried under an oak tree in the garden.

Freda Skinner, (1911–1993), sculptor and woodcarver, lived at number 35 and then number 79 from the late 1940s to about 1981.

Joan Howson (1885–1964), a British stained-glass artist lived at number 61 together with Caroline Charlotte Townshend (1878–1944) who was also a stained-glass artist. They converted the house as a studio and workshop. Joan's parents, Ethel and George John Howson, MA., lived at 79. After the war she was living at number 81 and then at number 79.

Margaret Edith Rope (1891–1988) moved to 61 Deodar Road in about 1926. She moved to 81 Deodar Road during the War, but when that house was bombed she moved to Storrington, Sussex. She returned to live at number 89 after the War, where she had a studio, workshop & kiln which was also used by Rachel de Montmorency (1891-1961).

They were neighbours to Edward Woore (1880–1960), also a stained-glass artist, who lived at number 66.

Roy Plomley OBE (1914–1985), broadcaster, lived at 91 Deodar Road.

Ellen Mary Rope (1855–1934), a British sculptor who shared her studio at number 66b with her assistant and niece, Dorothy Anne Aldrich Rope (1883-1971). Ellen Mary Rope was aunt of M. E. Aldrich Rope.

The writer Edna O'Brien and her son the author Carlo Gébler, lived at number 87.

The authors Nell Dunn and her husband Jeremy Sandford lived at number 57.

Number 65, 'Swan Studios', was the studio of stained-glass designers Colwyn & William Morris. Later John Edgar Platt (1886-1967), an English painter, woodcut artist and designer of stained glass, lived at Swan Studios.

The author and playwright Alan Herman (1916-1995) lived in Deodar Road.

The portrait and landscape artist Frank Samuel Eastman (1878-1964) lived at number 63, 'Thames Studio', from about 1935 until his death. His daughter, Mary Eastman (1906-1990), also a portrait painter, lived at number 67 from 1939 and after her mother's death in 1950 lived with her father at number 63, remaining there until 1970.

Ronald Alley, Keeper Modern Collection, Tate Gallery, lived at number 61 with his wife the sculptor Anthea Alley.

Peter Zinovieff (1933-2021), a British engineer and composer, lived in 49 Deodar Road. In the late 1960s, his company, Electronic Music Studios (EMS), made the VCS3, a synthesizer used by many early progressive rock bands.

The stained-glass artist Margaret Traherne (1919-2006) lived in Deodar Road in the 1950s and 1960s.

The Australian born composer Jennifer Fowler lives at number 21.

Hurlingham Yacht Club moved to 43A Deodar Road, under the railway Bridge, in 1928.

Number 109-115 was formerly known as Riverdale House, dating from the 1850s; it is on the council's Local List of buildings of architectural and historic interest and is the only building surviving from before the railway line.

Number 95 was formerly the site of Hurlingham Private School.

The artist Mary Stebbing Du Pontet (1909-1997) lived in Deodar Road, exhibiting at the Royal Academy Summer Exhibition in 1960 from number 66; she died at number 89.
