= Hugh Morgan =

Hugh Morgan may refer to:

- Hugh Morgan (apothecary) (c. 1530–1613), Queen Elizabeth's apothecary
- Huey Morgan (born 1968), frontman of the New York-based rock/hip hop group Fun Lovin' Criminals
- Hugh Morgan (businessman) (born 1940), Australian former Western Mining Corporation CEO
- Hugh Morgan (footballer, born 1869) (1869–1930), Scottish international football inside forward who played for Liverpool and Blackburn Rovers
- Hugh Morgan (footballer, born 1875), Scottish-born football outside forward whose clubs included Sunderland and Bolton Wanderers
- Hugh Jackson Morgan (1893–1961), American academic and college football player
