= St Paul's Church, Newington =

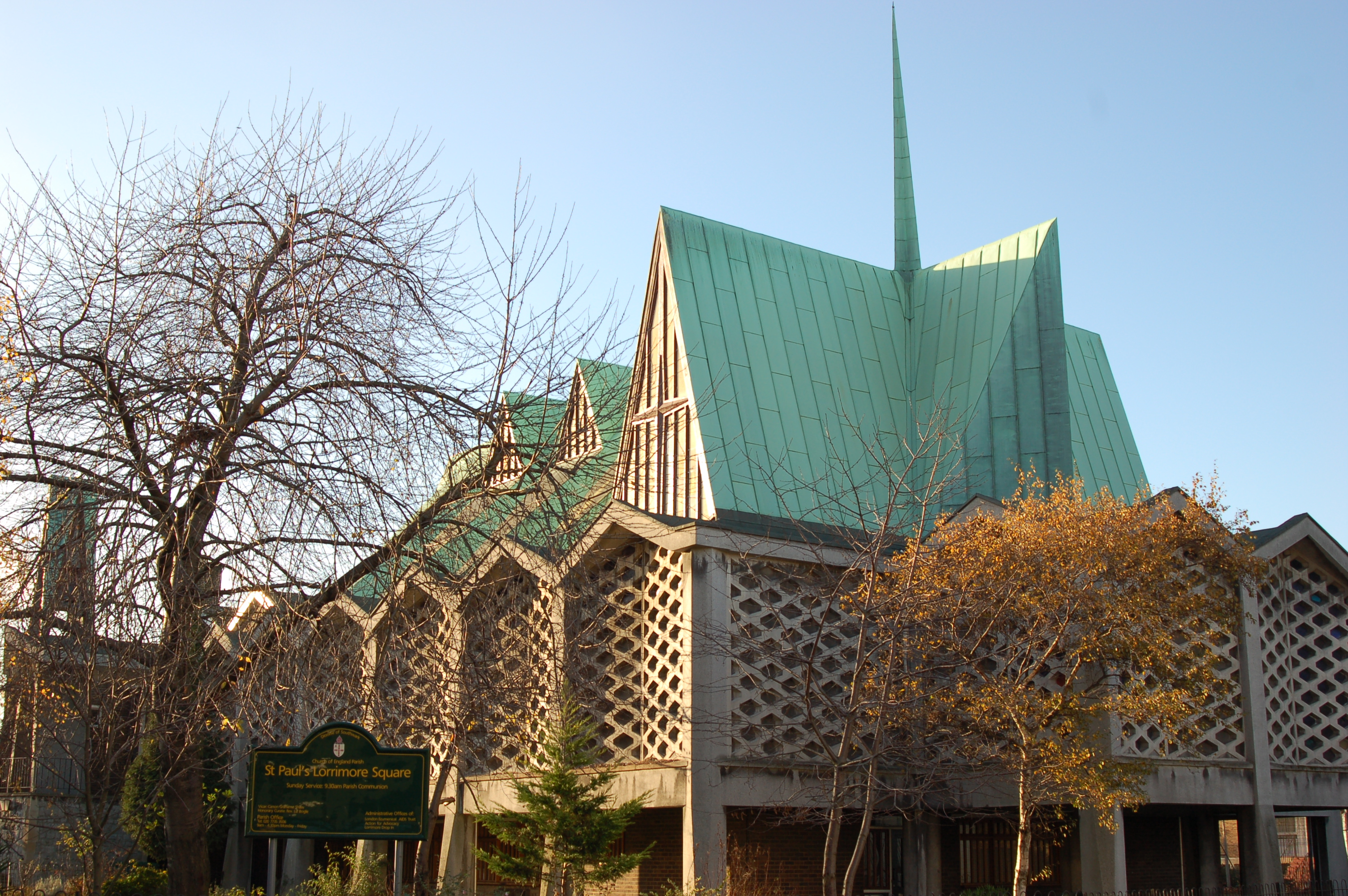
- The church viewed from Chapter Road.
- St Paul's Church, Newington
- 51.485055°N 0.100686°W
- Location: Newington, London
- Country: England
- Denomination: Church of England
- Churchmanship: Central Catholic
- Website: https://stpaulslorrimoresquare.org/

Architecture
- Heritage designation: Grade II
- Architect(s): Woodroffe Buchanan & Coulter
- Style: 1950s Contemporary
- Years built: 1959-60

Administration
- Diocese: Southwark

Clergy
- Vicar: Fr John Carruthers

St Paul's Church is a parish church in Lorrimore Square in the London Borough of Southwark. The church describes itself as St Paul's, Lorrimore Square.

== History ==
The original church was designed by local ecclesiastical architect Henry Jarvis. This church was built in the 1850s during the tenure as rector of William Cadman. The original church, then known as St Paul's, Walworth, was a prominent centre for Anglo-Catholicism; Choral Eucharist was the principal Sunday service as early as 1863. The Survey of London includes a plate of the original church. It was in the Gothic Revival style, and was almost completely destroyed in the London Blitz.

=== Post War ===
The current church was designed by firm Woodroffe Buchanan & Coulter and built in 1959–60. It is Grade II listed.

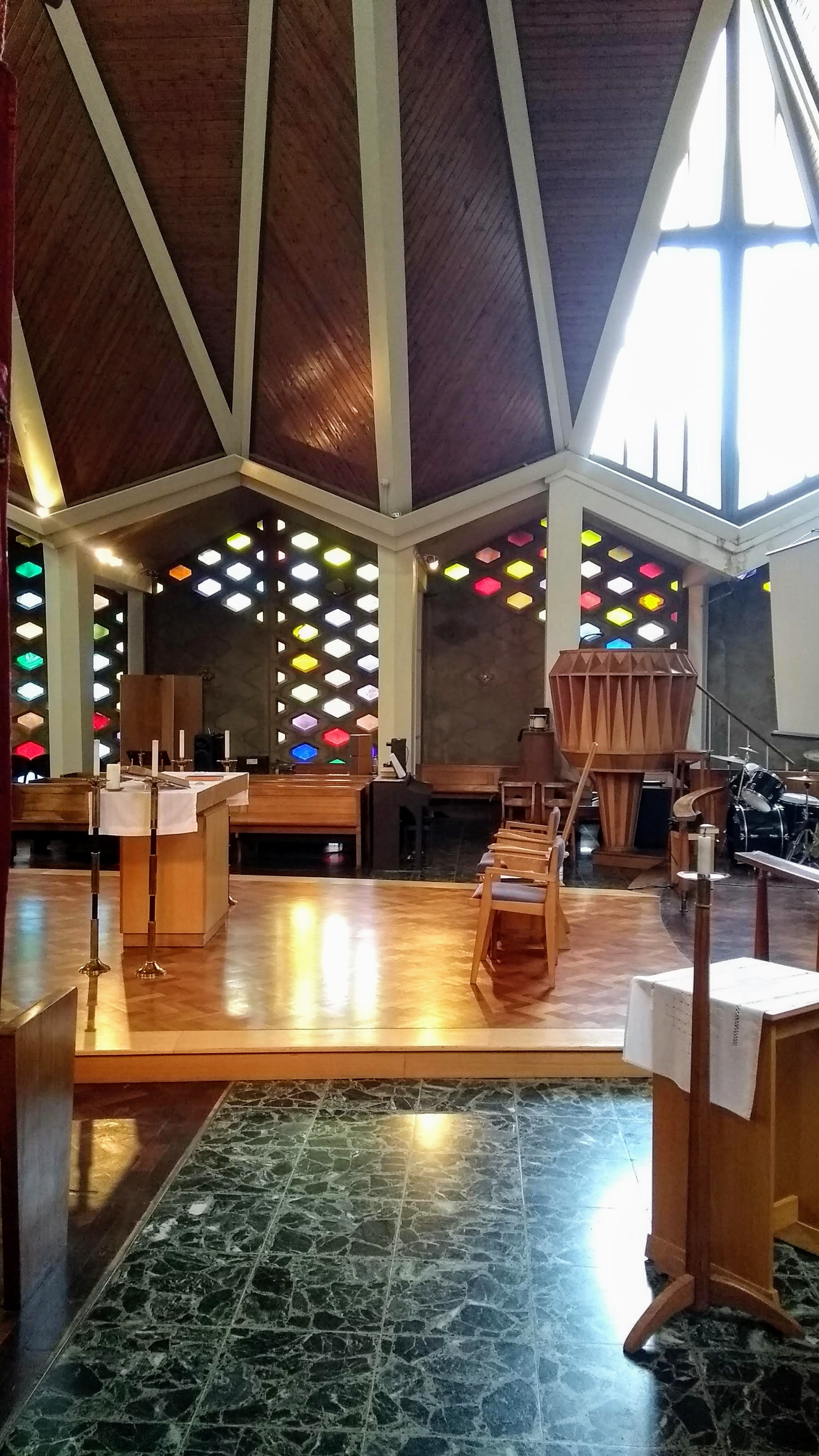
Interior showing the altar, pulpit, roof and stained glass.

The building is a modernist, reinforced concrete buttressed form with a community centre on the ground floor and the church itself and church hall above. There is an organ loft at the west end and a small Lady Chapel behind the altar at the east.

The "folded" roof is made of plate timber and coated in turquoise oxidised copper; it incorporates a series of triangles, symbolising the Holy Trinity. The external walls are a mix of brick, reclaimed stone from the original church, and artificial blocks, some incorporating multicoloured stained glass units.

The interior includes artworks by Freda Skinner and Gerald Holtom.

The key elements of the description in the listing are as follows: "Reinforced concrete in-situ frame supporting pre-cast timber and steel roof. Its facetted structure gives it triangulation and great strength, clad in copper. Wall infill of precast concrete blocks perforated and infilled with … coloured glass, and brick, over plinth formed of rubble stone from the earlier church destroyed in 1941. … Quirky elevations dominated by steep-pitched, faceted copper roof, with fleche over entrance, and with deep eaves. Six-bay church has concrete honeycomb concrete facade, with antique coloured glass infill, set between projecting concrete piers and under zig-zag gabled eaves. The Lady chapel forms a projection at East end, similar in style but with lower eaves. … The church is dominated by its soaring roof, lined in unpainted timber, with white painted ribs to emphasise this unusual structure. Fittings, including the pulpit, font, and crucifix all designed by [John] Wimbleton. East end sculpture of the Risen Christ in Glory by Freda Skinner, symbolic of the Crucifixion, Resurrection and Ascension, over altar with applique decoration by Gerald Holtom depicting the twelve apostles."

Pevsner describes the church building as “a restless, somewhat self-consciously modern exterior”.

The parish website has an extensive photographic archive of the fixtures and fittings.

The church was the subject of a detailed article by the Twentieth Century Society as its Building of the Month in October 2010. The wood carving "The Risen Christ in Glory" is by Freda Skinner (1960); it has a cross 16 ft and the figure is 8 ft high.

RIBA’s online archive has a photograph of the church from 1962 on it, before the surrounding vegetation grew to its current height.
