= Boris Smirnoff =

French painter

"Still life with samovar and bread", watercolour painted by Boris Smirnoff

Boris Smirnoff (1903 - 2007) was a Franco-Russian cubist, avant-gardist and analytical art painter.

Boris Smirnoff was born in Russia. He had two brothers - Alexander and Vladimir. He was the youngest son. Vladimir was known as the artist-amateur and the futurist, big admirer of David Burliuk and Vasily Kamensky.

His family escaped to France in 1917 after the October Revolution in Russia. Boris behind them, and stayed in Petrograd. He is learning as artist and works in Meyerhold Theatre.

In 1926 Boris has found the new idol - Pavel Filonov with new "Analytical Art".

In 1927 Boris Smirnoff has appeared in France. He worked as a painter in France. Over the next decade, he drew a lot of oil paintings and pastels.

All this oils and pastels were burned by the German invaders as "degenerate art" during the Second World War.

Because of this Boris Smirnoff began to draw exclusively watercolour on paper after the war. He said: "I can always put these watercolours into a suitcase and to carry away with myself!"

Boris Smirnoff refused to sell his artworks like his teacher Pavel Filonov.

After the Second World War Boris Smirnoff had lived in Great Britain and Lisbon, Portugal, in Malaysia and Singapore, in Switzerland and the Netherlands.

Many years later, Boris returned to Russia and saw that it was a different country. This was not the Russia, from which he left. And, even though the country largely did not like him, he remained there until his death.

Until his death, he did not sell his watercolours. He said: "One hundred and four years - this is not a reason to change my habits".

Boris Smirnoff died in Russia in 2007 at the age of 104. After his death the Boris Smirnoff Foundation was organised to manage his collection. Today, one of the key locations the public can see his art is at the Vineyard Hotel, Newbury, Berkshire, England.
