= The Vineyard Hotel (Berkshire) =

Hotel, restaurant and spa in Berkshire, England

Coordinates: 51.41331°N 1.36656°W

The Vineyard is a hotel, restaurant and spa located near Newbury, Berkshire, United Kingdom, rated 5-star prior to 2014. It has won a number of awards and was in 2015 the primary restaurant of Chef Daniel Galmiche . It has 49 rooms and suites, dining room, spa and conference/event facilities. It is a part of the Relais & Châteaux group and a member of Pride of Britain Hotels.

== History ==
The building was originally an 18th-century hunting lodge owned by the Foley family, who owned land locally. Grace, daughter of Thomas Lord Foley, wife of James Hamilton Earl of Clanbrassil (Viscount Limerk, Baron Clanboy) was the last of the Foley family. She died in 1748 without an heir and the land was sold to a Rev. Hartley in the mid-19th Century. The lodge was later owned by the Sutton Estate. By the 1960s the building was rented out as flats.

In 1969, Foley Lodge was converted into a restaurant and banqueting centre. In 1978 it was refurbished as The Foley Lodge hotel. Sir Peter Michael purchased the property in 1996 and relaunched it under the current name 'The Vineyard' in March 1998.

The hotel is owned by the Michael family, headed by Sir Peter Michael, who was one of the founders of Classic FM.

== Art collection ==
The hotel features sculpture and paintings by Diane Maclean, William Pye, Henri Martin, Ronald Searle, Boris Smirnoff and Doris Zinkeisen.

== Awards and recognitions ==
- Restaurant of the Year 2012 - Decanter Magazine/ Laurent Perrier Awards
- Sommelier of the Year 2011 (Yohann Jousselin)
- AA - 5 Red Stars
- Rising Chef - Relais & Châteaux Trophies (Daniel Galmiche)
- Good Spa Guide 2012 – Best Customer Service shortlist
- Imbibe Wine List of the Year 2012
