= St Mary's Church, Battersea =

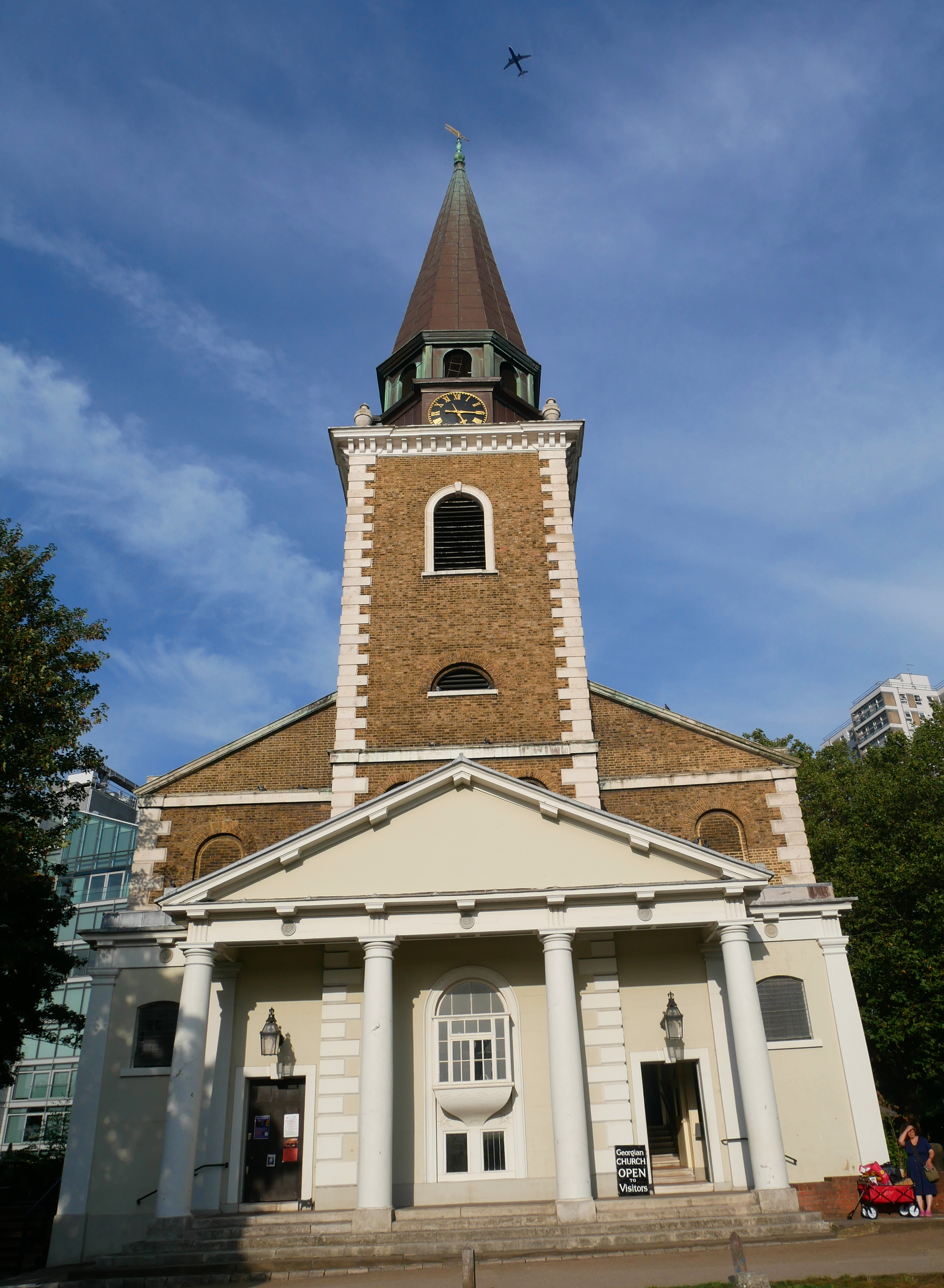
- West face of the church

- Location in the Borough of Wandsworth
- 51°28′36″N 0°10′32″W
- Location: Battersea Church Road, Battersea, Greater London, SW11 3NA
- Country: England
- Denomination: Church of England
- Churchmanship: Inclusive Central
- Website: Church website

History
- Status: Active
- Founded: c.800 AD

Architecture
- Functional status: Parish church
- Heritage designation: Grade I listed
- Completed: 1777

Administration
- Diocese: Diocese of Southwark

Clergy
- Vicar: Reverend Canon Simon Butler

St Mary's Church, Battersea is an Anglican church in Greater London. It is the oldest of the churches in Battersea, London Borough of Wandsworth, in the inner south-west of the UK's capital city. Its parish is shared by three Anglican churches is in the Diocese of Southwark. Christians have worshipped at the site continuously since around 800 AD. It is a Grade I listed building for its combined heritage and architectural merit.

== History ==
St. Mary's is among the earliest five documented Christian holy sites south of the River Thames in London, historically in Surrey, in the Diocese of Winchester. The original church was built around 800 AD, and the present building was completed in 1777. It was designed by Joseph Dixon, a local architect.

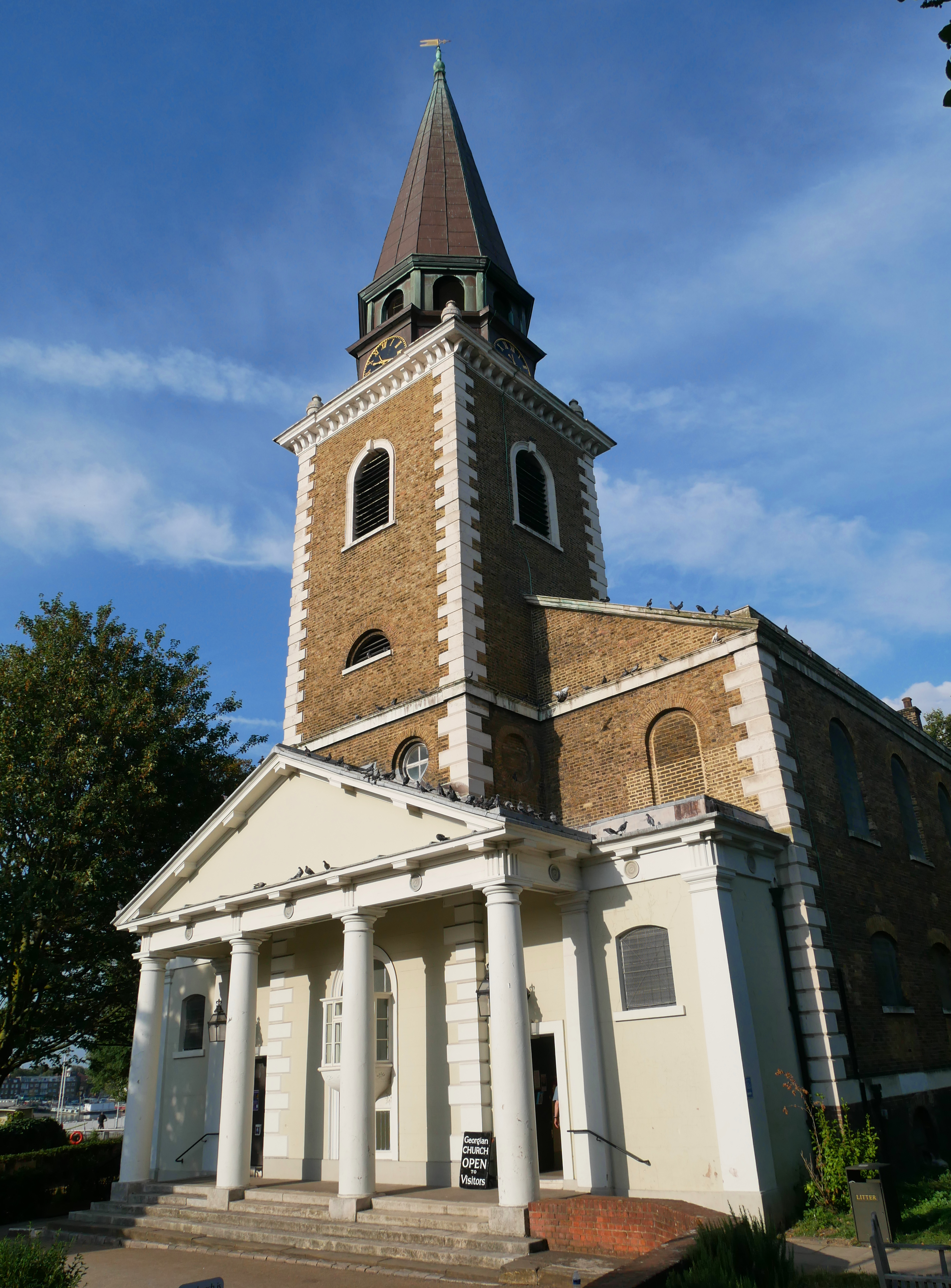
Southwest view of the church

The church is built of brick, with stone used for quoins and other dressings. It consists of a nave, rectangular in plan, an apse at the east end forming the sanctuary, and a west tower. The west front has a single storey entrance porch with Tuscan columns supporting a pediment. The tower, rising immediately behind it, is topped with a clock chamber and a small spire. Inside, the whole width of the church is spanned by a flat ceiling, and there are wooden galleries supported by columns on three sides. The nave windows are in two tiers, the upper ones round-headed.

The modern triptych in the side chapel is by John Napper (1946). It shows the Annunciation with Battersea Park and the Power Station in the background. To the right Christ walks on the Thames and to the left Lazarus rises beneath the church porch.

The organ is by Saxon Aldred (1993), with a carving of a ram in recognition of the Ram Brewery.

In the sanctuary the east window dates from 1379, the painted window glass dates from 1631 with portraits of Henry VII, Margaret Beaufort, and Queen Elizabeth I. The Dove and Lamb windows, originally from 1796, by James Pearson, were restored in 1946 after being damaged by a V1 in 1944.

At the back is the terracotta War Memorial by Freda Skinner, depicting the Gate of Life guarded by the Angel of Sacrifice.

The glass doors to the Vestry were added in 2008 and were engraved by Sally Scott FGE.

The church has strong connections with art and literature through the artist and poet William Blake, who married Catherine Boucher there on 17 August 1782, and J. M. W. Turner, who painted the river from the vestry window.

The church was used as a filming location for ITV drama Soldier Soldier marking the funeral of Corporal Tony Wilton in Series 4, Episode 13.

== Windows ==
Four modern stained glass windows in the north and south aisles of the nave remember luminaries connected to the church. The windows were designed and made by John Hayward and installed between 1976 and 1982.

- The Benedict Arnold Window (south aisle, 1976). Below a portrait of Arnold in uniform are the arms of George Washington with the American flag, Betsy Ross flag, Continental Union flag of 1775, and the 'Union Jack' above. After fighting for Washington in the American War of Independence, Arnold changed sides to become an officer in the British Army.
- The William Blake Window (north aisle, 1979). It includes the figure of Albion at the bottom of the window. In the centre is 'Emanation', a winged image of a figure. The portrait of Blake is from his portrait by Thomas Phillips. The figures either side represent Innocence and Experience. At the bottom left is Blake's signature from the marriage register, together with two drawings by Blake and his wife Catherine.
- The J. M. W. Turner Window (north aisle, 1979). Turner lived in Chelsea and visited Battersea to paint in the vestry window. The window was given by The Morgan Crucible Company Ltd to commemorate their long association with the Parish of Battersea.
- The William Curtis Window (south aisle, 1982). Curtis, a botanist and founder of the Linnean Society, is buried in the churchyard. The frame of the portrait is from 'Flora Londinensis': Geranium, wild daffodil, snowdrop, cuckoo pint, grasses, vetch, blackberry, bryony, bindweed, primrose, daisy, dandelion, wild rose, angelica, lovage, mistletoe, buttercup. The epitaph is from the now lost headstone. There is the emblem of the RHS, the arms of the Society of Apothecaries and the arms of the Linnean Society. The map shows the locations of his gardens (Bermondsey, Charlton, Lambeth Marsh and Brompton) and the Chelsea Physic Garden.
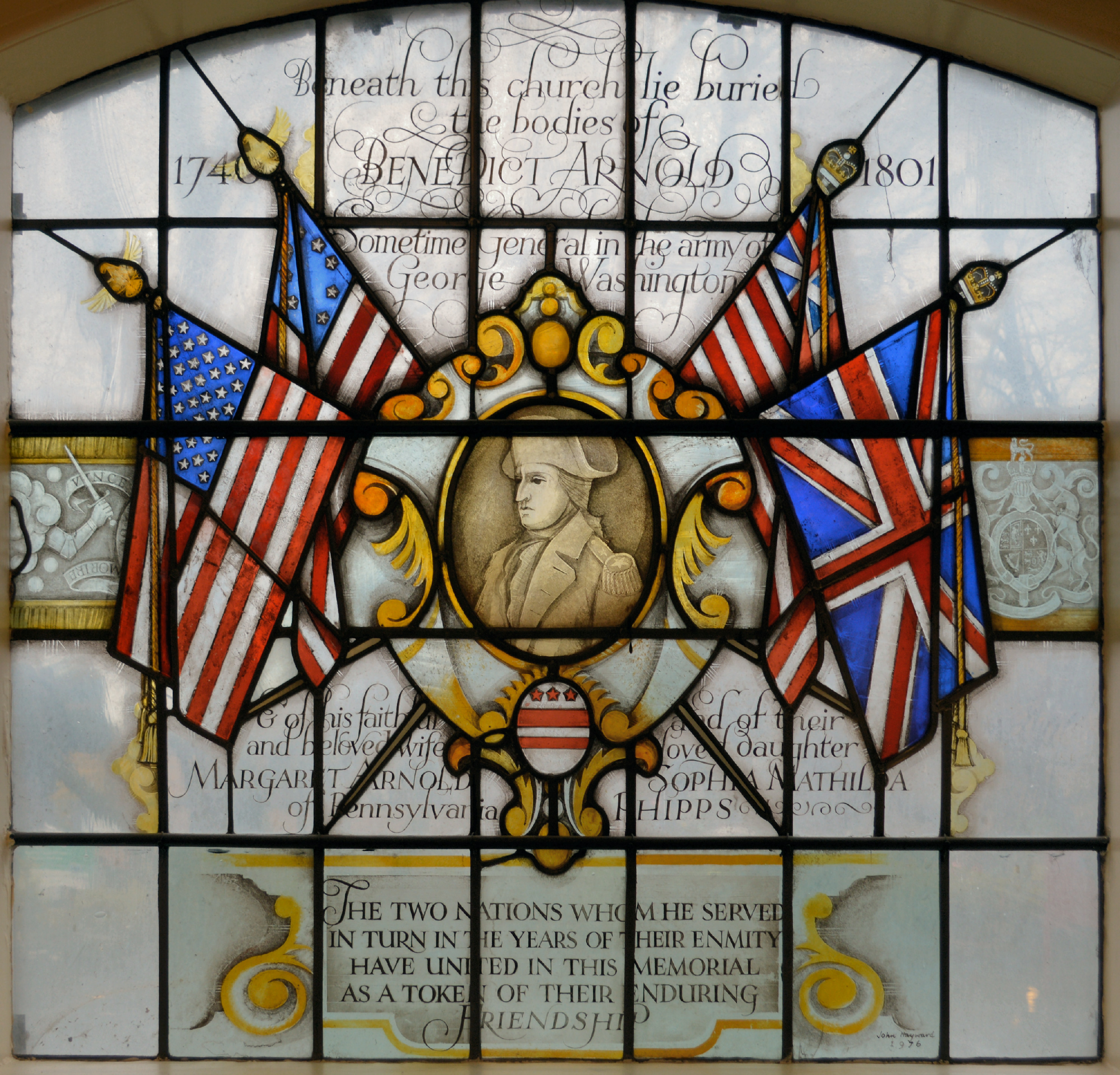
Benedict Arnold window

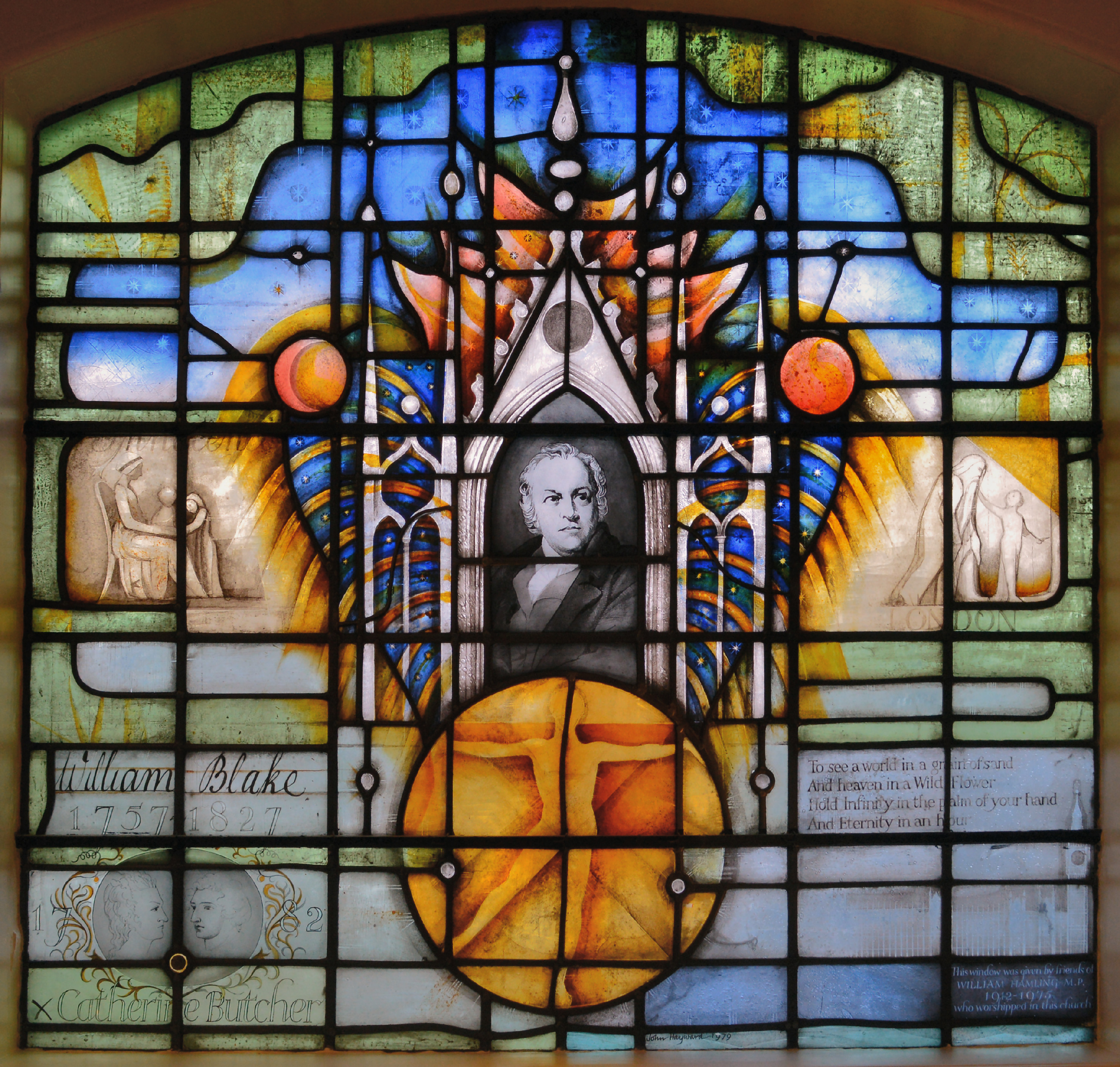
William Blake window

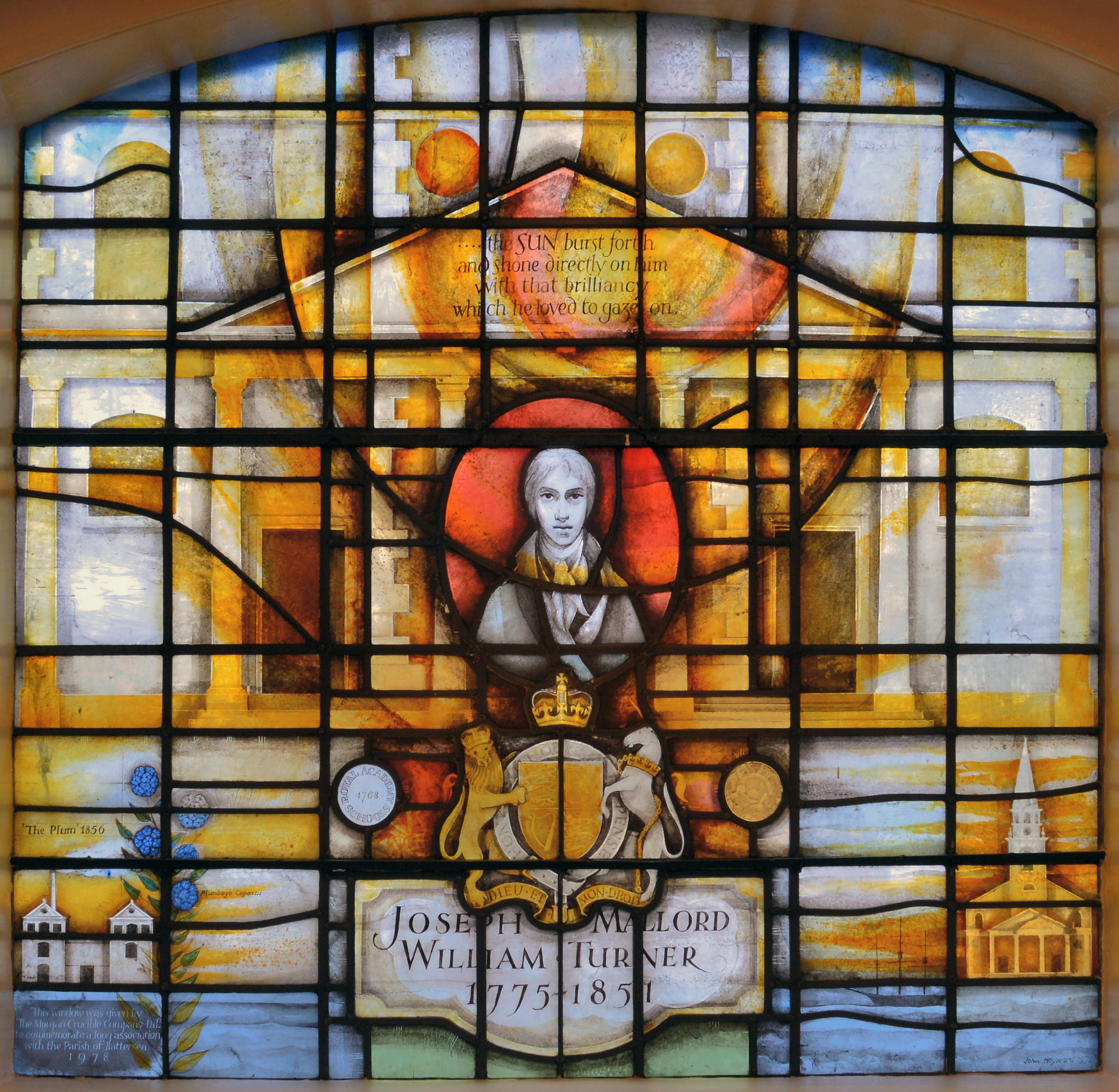
J. M. W. Turner window

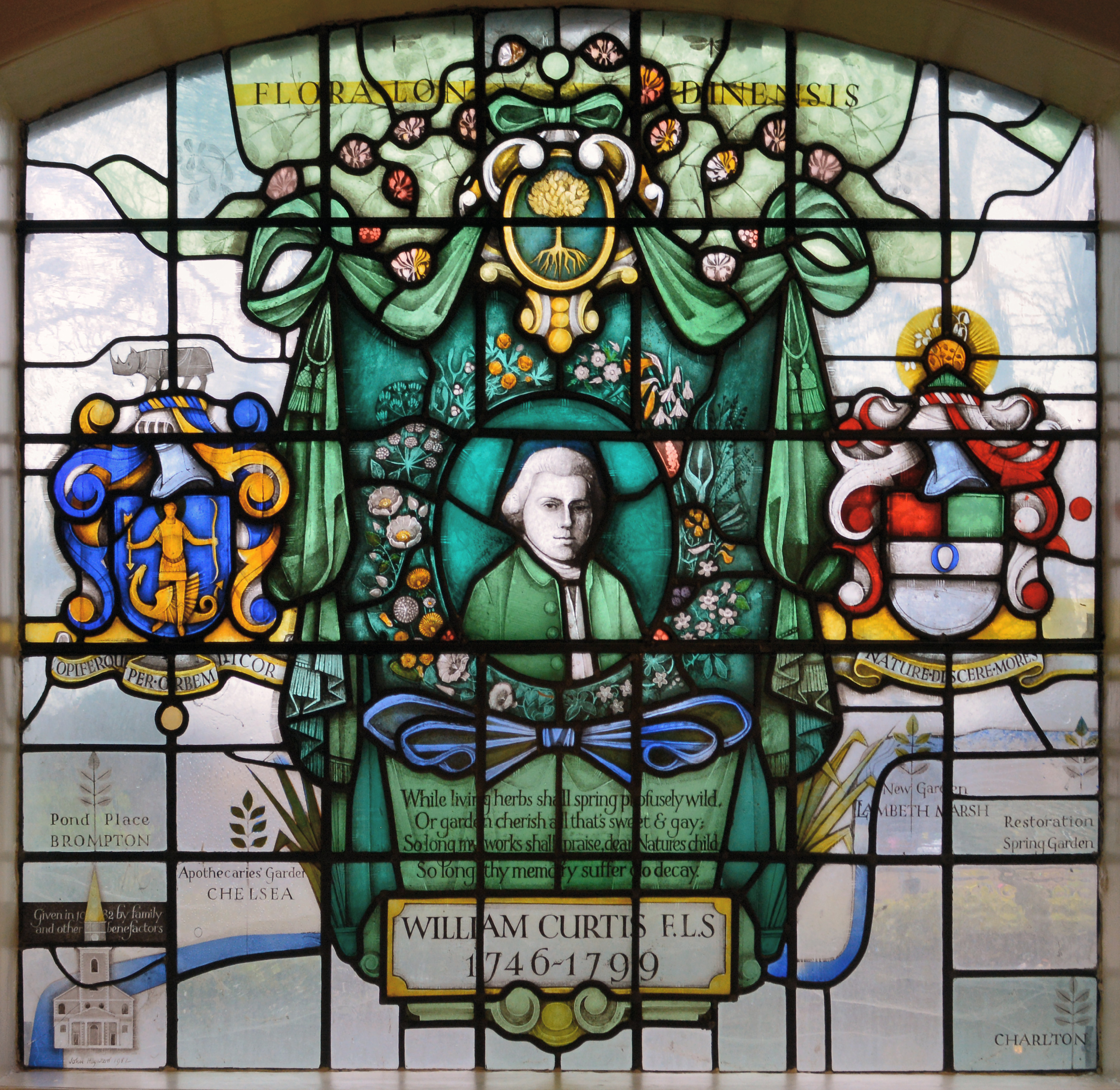
Williams Curtis window

== Monuments ==
The church includes several important monuments from the earlier church.

Two busts for Baron Oliver Nicholas St John of Lydeard (Viscount Grandison), (d.1630), Lord High Treasurer and Lord Deputy of Ireland, and his wife, Joan Roydon. The sculptor was Nicholas Stone the Elder (1586/7-1647).

Sir Edward Wynter (d.1685). The monument has a bust at the top. The lower panel shows him fighting a tiger and Moors. The epitaph describes his adventures.

Sir John Fleet, Knight, (d.1712). He was Lord Mayor in 1695.

James Bull, Merchant, aged 44 years, (d. 1713), son-in-law of Sir John Fleet.

Henry St John, (d.1751), Viscount Bolingbroke, Secretary of War and Secretary of State under Queen Anne, and Mary Clara des Champs de Marcilly, Marchioness of Villette and Viscountess Bolingroke, (d.1750). There are cameo portraits of them, facing each other, either side of the shield. The epitaphs are by Bolingbroke. The sculptor is Louis-François Roubiliac, signed at the base.

John Camden, (d. 1780), and his eldest daughter Elizabeth Neild, (d. 1791). Girl by a funeral urn with a poetic eulogy. Signed by Coade of Lambeth (1792).

Richard Rothwell, (d.1821), and his wife Eleanor, (d.1834). By J. G. Bubb.

== Notable interments ==
- Benedict Arnold and his family are buried in the crypt.
- William Curtis is buried in the churchyard
- John Inglis (bishop)
- Sir Rupert George
- Nathaniel Middleton (1750–1807), a civil servant of the British East India Company.
- Hugh Morgan, apothecary to Queen Elizabeth I

== Gallery ==
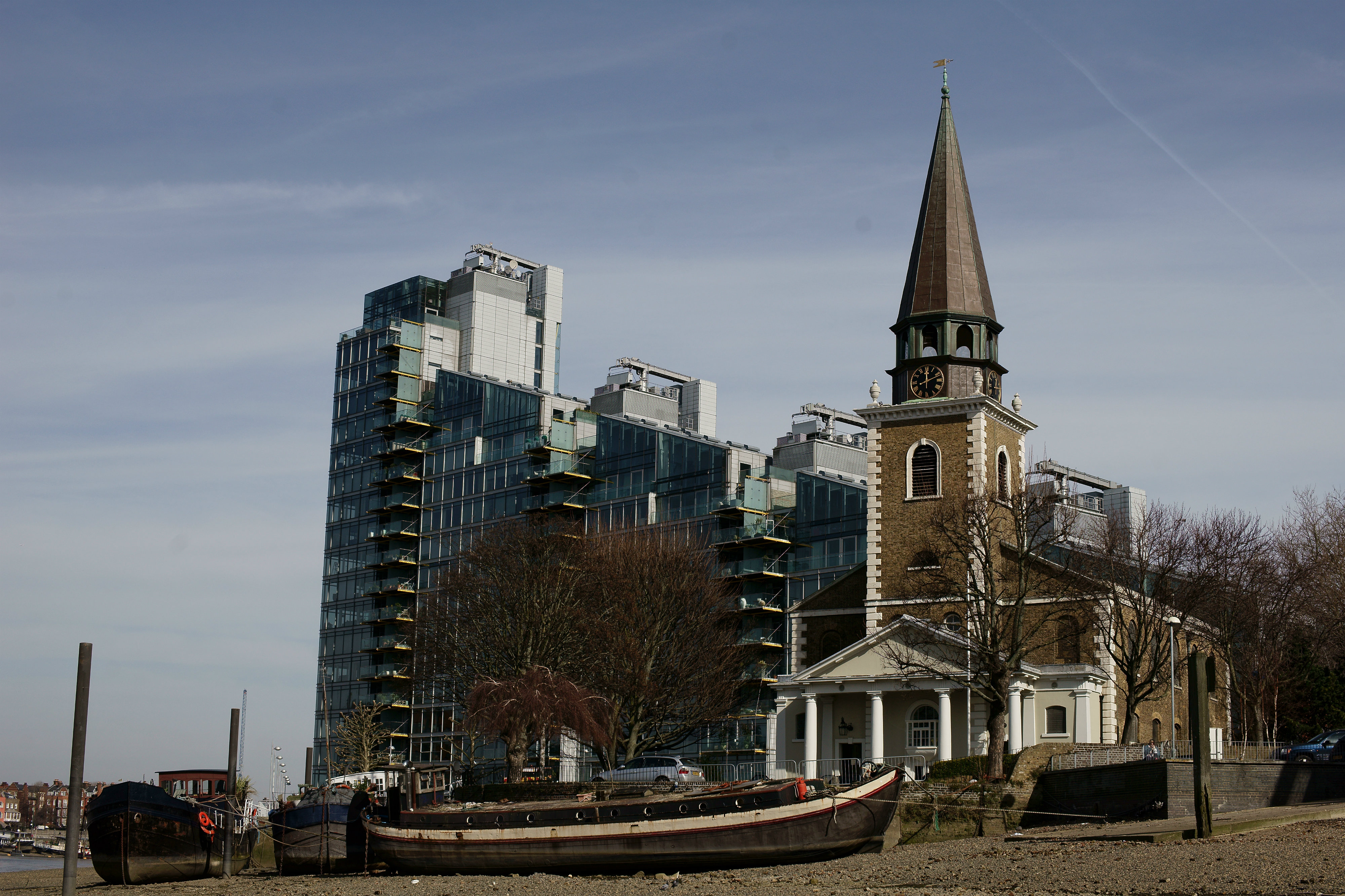
St.Mary's, Battersea

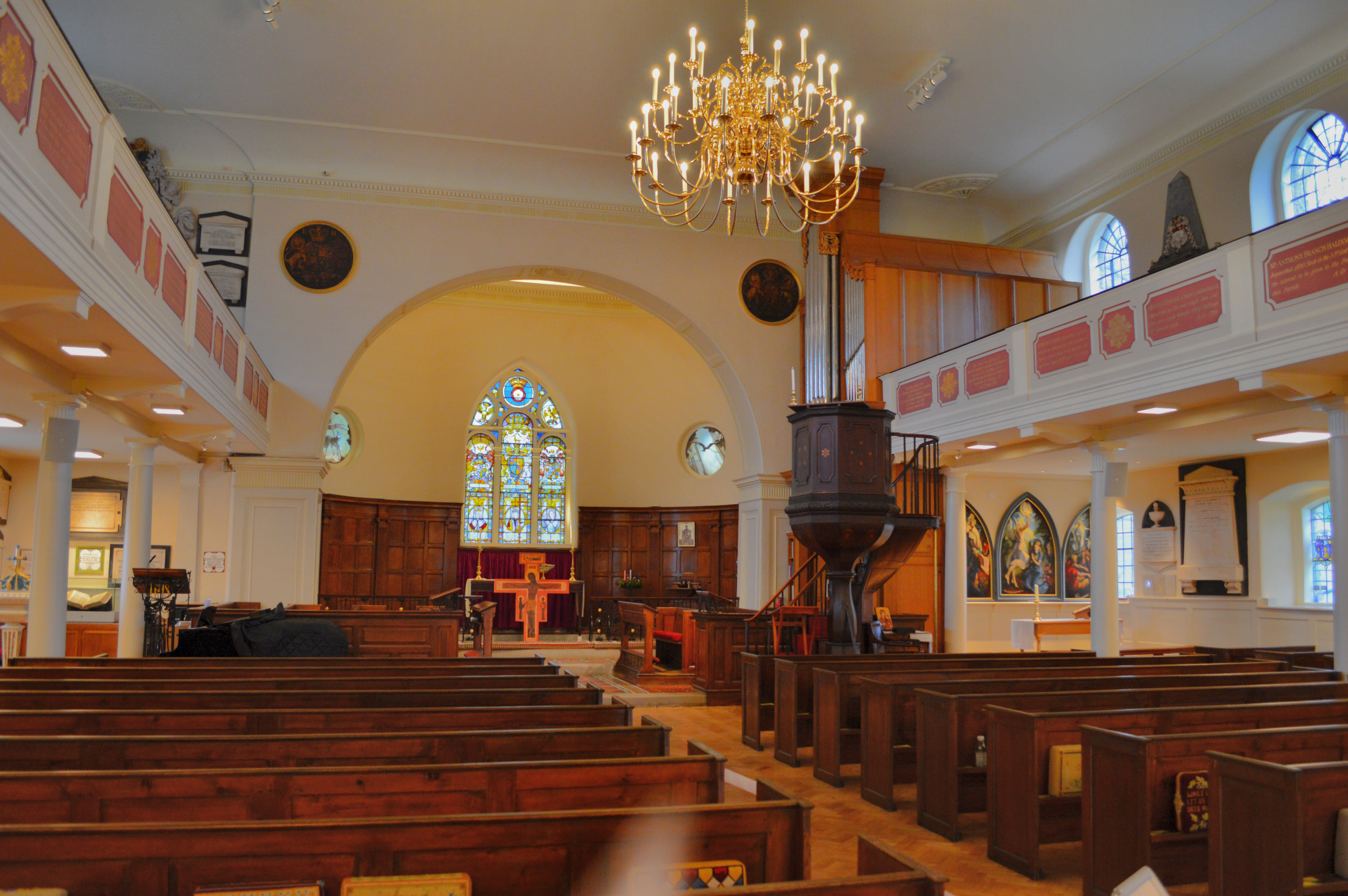
Interior

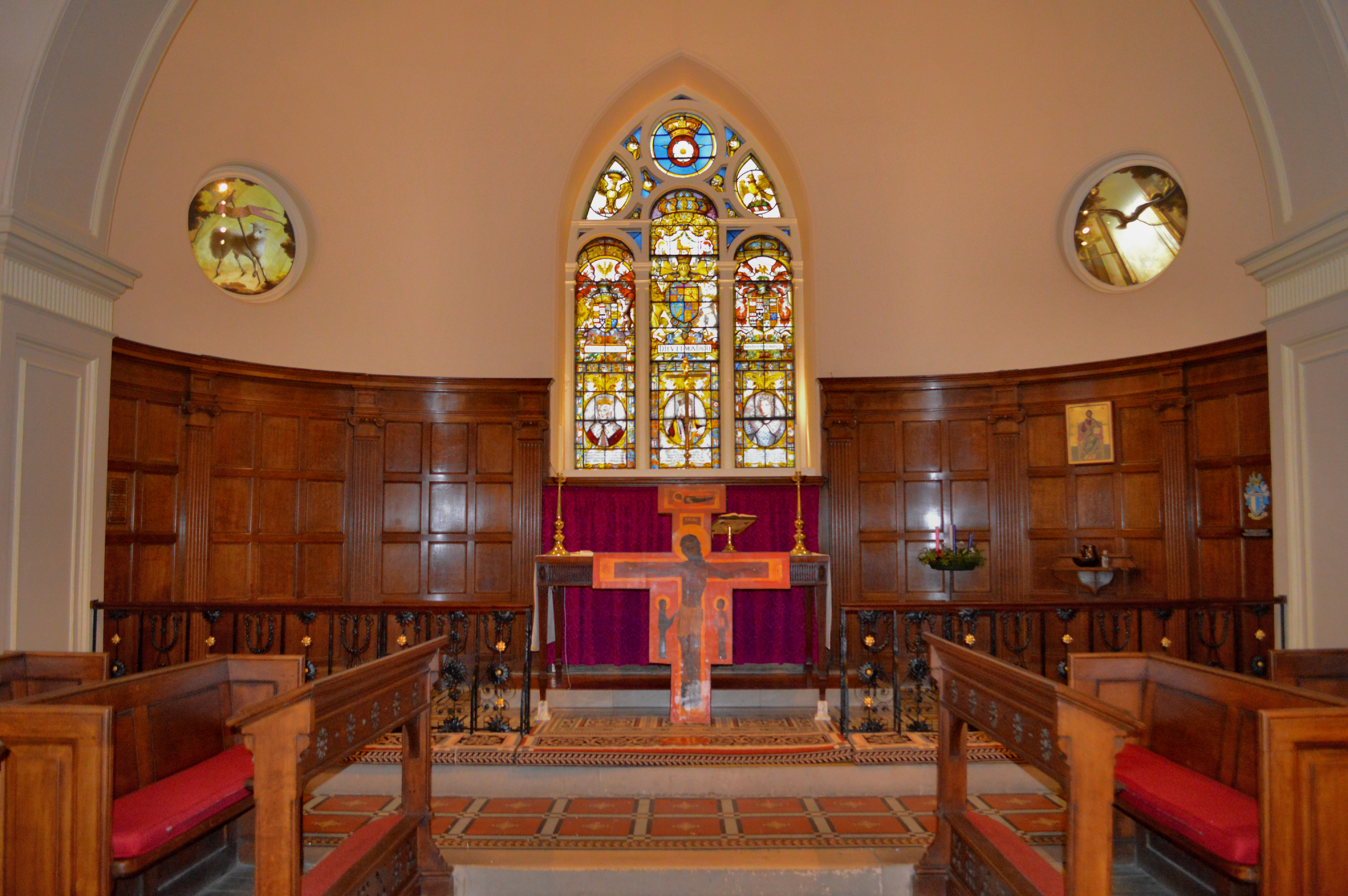
The Sanctuary

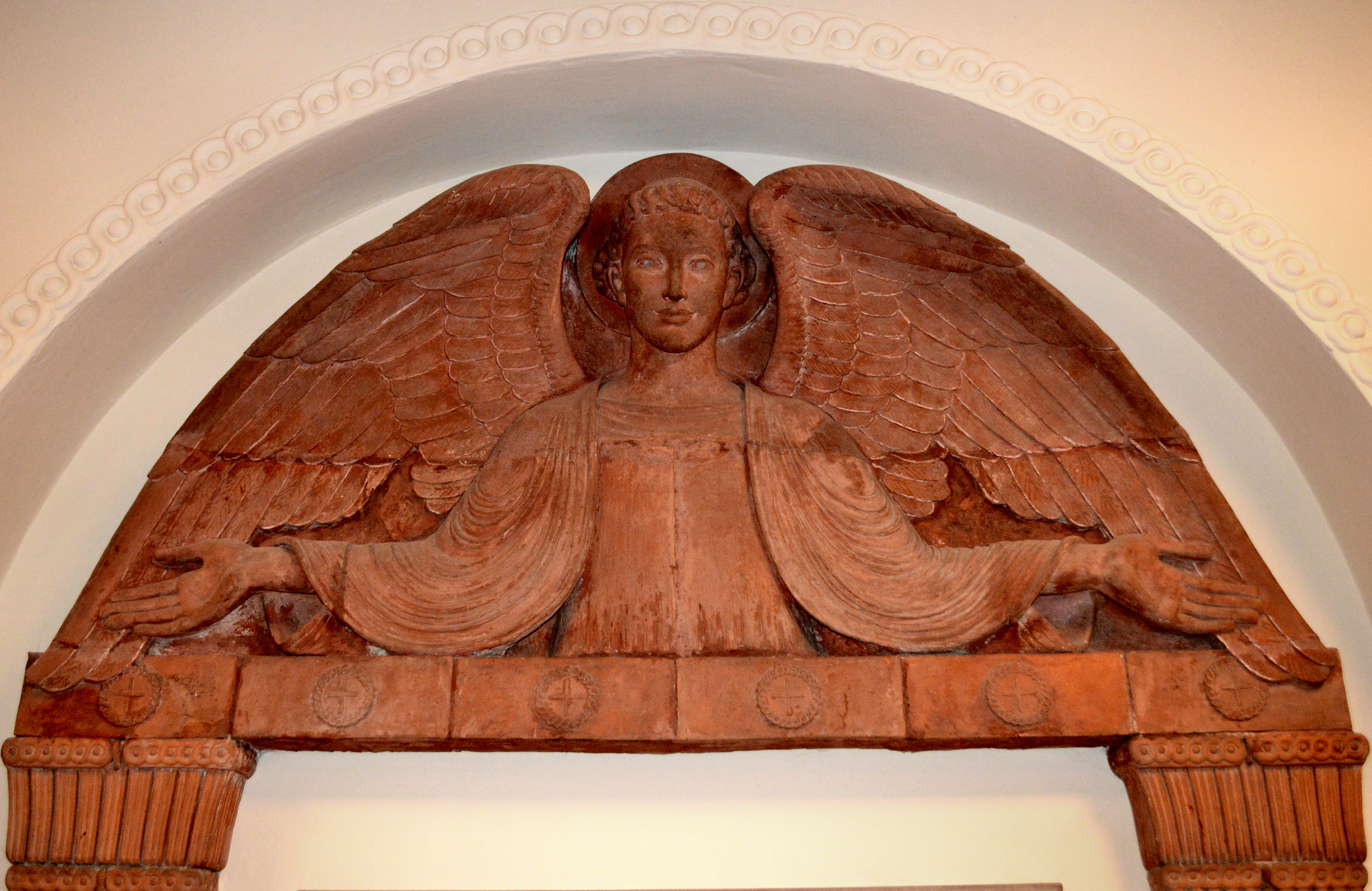
Angel of Sacrifice

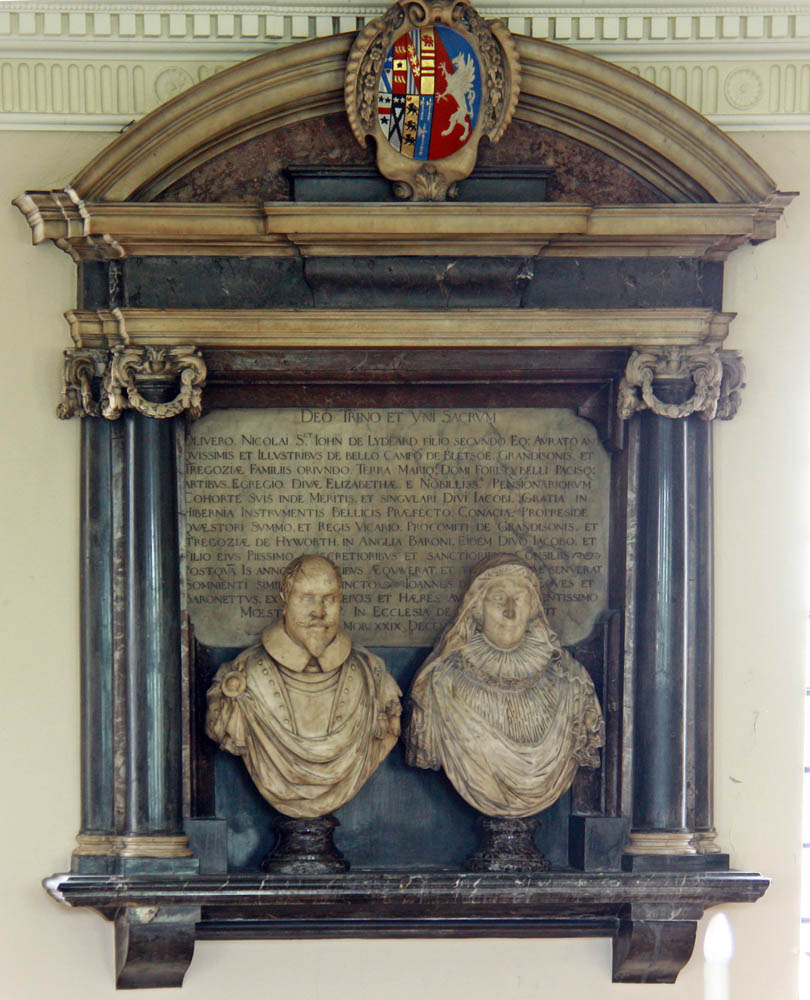
St John of Lydeard monument

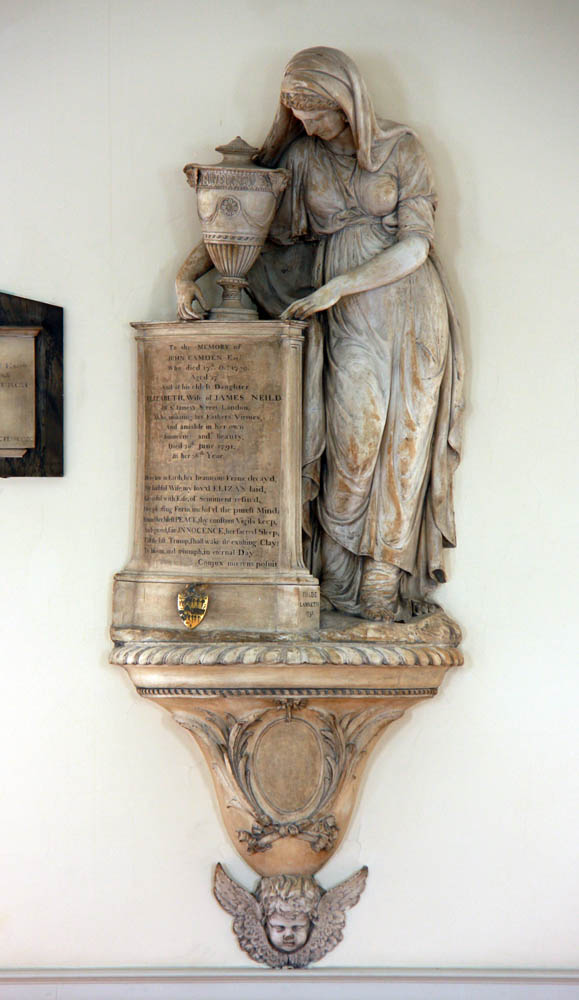
John Camden monument
