= Ronald Alley =

British art historian and curator (1926–1999)

Ronald Edgar Alley (12 March 1926 – 25 April 1999) was a British art historian and curator. He was keeper of the modern collection at the Tate Gallery, London from 1965 to 1986.

Ronald Alley was born in Bristol on 12 March 1926 and educated at Bristol Grammar School.

During the war, Alley volunteered as a Bevin Boy and worked as a miner, and afterwards studied at the Courtauld Institute of Art.

In 1951, Alley joined the Tate, and was instrumental in them acquiring modern art, particularly from the New York school and Abstract Expressionists including Mark Rothko, Robert Rauschenberg and Jasper Johns.

In 1964, Alley produced the first catalogue raisonné of the work of Francis Bacon.

In 1955, Alley married the sculptor Anthea Oswell, and they had two daughters, Fiammetta and Melissa, both of whom are painters. They divorced in 1973, and she continued to live upstairs in their home in Deodar Road, Putney, London. In 1993, they remarried just before she died.

== Publications ==
- Francis Bacon: catalogue raisonné and documentation (1964) Thames and Hudson
