= Hugh Morgan (apothecary) =

Apothecary to Queen Elizabeth

Hugh Morgan (c.1530–1613) was born in Bradfield, Essex. He was appointed as apothecary to Queen Elizabeth I of England around July 1583. He was supposed to become Master of the Grocers' Company a few months before the time when he was appointed, and asked to be excused from taking office so he could fulfill his duties. Morgan is believed to have introduced vanilla to Queen Elizabeth, in 1602, as a flavour. He died in his home in Battersea in 1613. He was buried in St. Mary's Church on 13 September.
