= Anthea Alley =

British sculptor and artist

Anthea Priscilla Frederica Alley (nee Oswell, 5 January 1927 – 9 October 1993) was a British sculptor, painter, and teacher.

She was born Anthea Priscilla Frederica Oswell in Seremban, Malaya on 5 January 1927. She lived in Australia and South Africa during the Second World War. In 1944 she moved to London with her family and studied painting at the Regent Street Polytechnic, Chelsea College of Art and the Royal College of Art. She taught at Bath Academy of Art, Corsham for several years.

Alley started as a painter, focusing on brutalist abstract paintings utilizing everyday materials, but she is best known for her sculptures. When it came to sculpture, Alley was self-taught and by the late 1950s she was recognized as an emerging British sculptor. From 1957 she concentrated on sculpture art, producing welded pieces alongside assemblage paintings. In 1960, Alley held her first one-person show at the Molton Gallery and in 1961 she received a John Moores Painting Prize.

She was married to Ronald Alley, an art historian and Keeper of the Modern Collection at the Tate Gallery, London. They had two children, Melissa and Fiammetta Alley.

She died in London on 9 October 1993.

Examples of her work are in the permanent collection of the Tate Gallery, the Arts Council and Birmingham Art Gallery.
