= Frank Samuel Eastman =

English painter

- Born: 27 April 1878; Anerley, Surrey, England
- Died: 12 October 1964 (aged 86); Battersea, London, England
- Occupation: Artist
- Known for: Portrait and Landscape paintings

Frank Samuel Eastman (27 April 1878 – 12 October 1964) was an English artist known for portraits and landscapes.

== Education ==
Eastman attended the Croydon School of Art. He then studied at the Royal Academy of Arts (1899 to 1904) where he received a scholarship worth £50 per year. He also was awarded the Landseer Scholarship worth £40 per year. In 1901, he won the Academy's silver medal for his Painting of a Figure from Life. Eastman graduated in January 1904.
