= Lorrimore Square =

Garden square in Southwark, London

Coordinates: 51°29′5″N 0°6′4″W

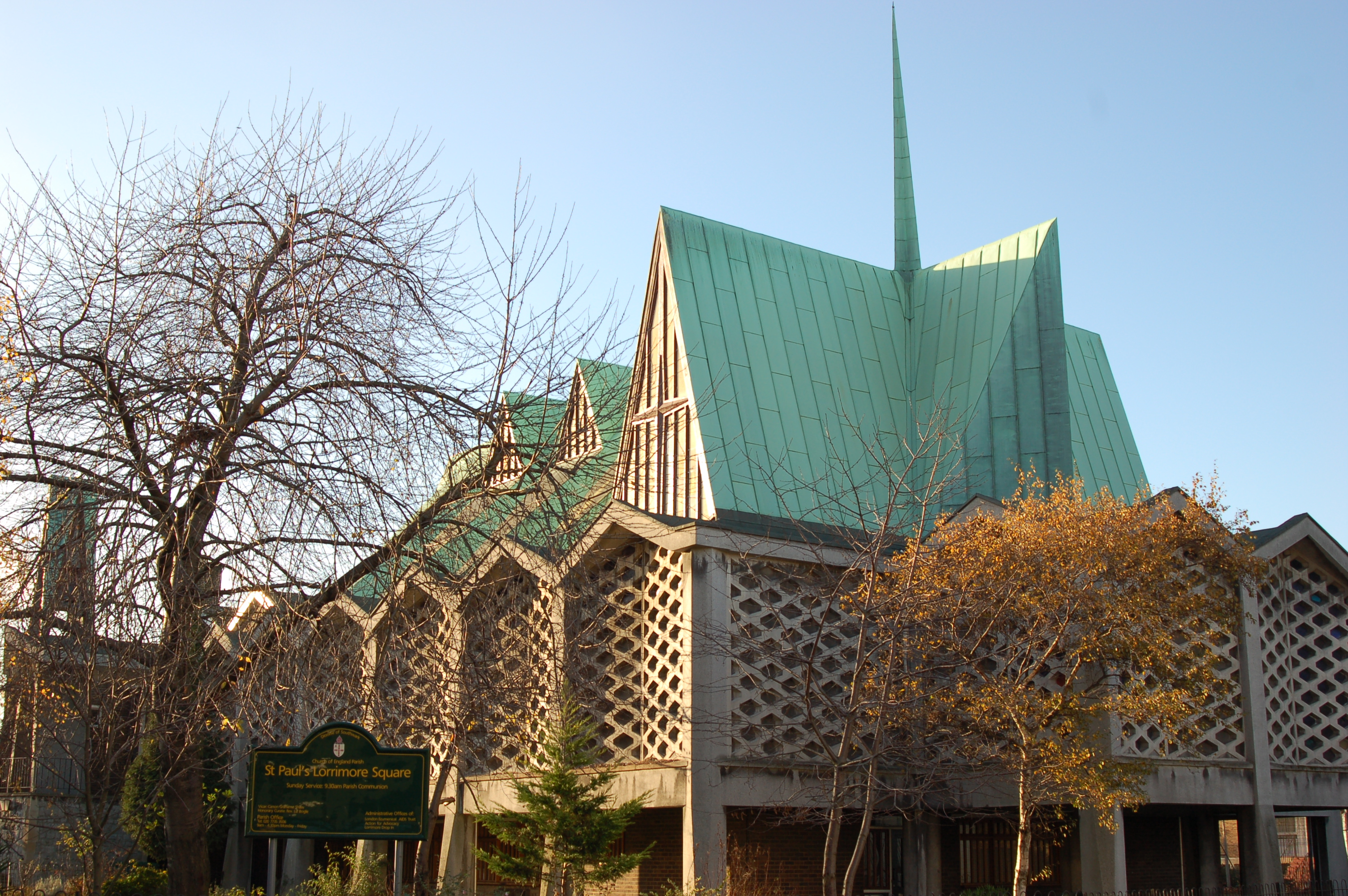
St Paul's Church on Lorrimore Square.

Lorrimore Square is a 1.5-acre (0.6 ha) garden square in the far south-west of Southwark, London, England, centred 500 metres south-east of Kennington tube station. It is divided into four sections, a church with integrated drop-in centre; a small enclosed garden without paths; a public playground/gardens; and a basketball/netball pitch. One side of the square is classical architecture of four storeys, the other two sides — the fourth side marks the end of units on another road — are late 20th century rows of apartments of slightly lower height.

== Etymology ==
A 1681 map of Walworth made for Dean and Chapter of Canterbury Cathedral shows a wider common called "Lattam-more" (or Lower Moor); Lorrimore is a corruption of Lower Moor.

== London Blitz ==
Lorrimore Square was hit by incendiary bombs during the London Blitz in World War II (in 1940) causing the first form of the church to burn down except for the steeple.

== Post war ==
The current church was built in 1959–60. About half of the square is a public garden. The rest, from near its centre to the north-east, centre edge of the square — the square is laid out obliquely to the cardinal points of the compass — is St Paul's Church, flanked by a basketball/netball pitch accessible by local clubs and a small enclosed tree-studded garden with flowering shrubs. Together these internal contents, net of surrounding roads and buildings, occupy 1.5 acres (0.61 ha); the gross area (square development's estate), including facing rows of flats and a Victorian terrace with their yards behind is 3.7 acres (1.5 ha).

One side of the square is classical architecture of four storeys set behind black railings in the same way as most of the square, with basement gardens. The other two sides — the fourth side marks the end of units and forms another road which is unlike the rest of the square a motor vehicles thoroughfare, Chapter Road — are late 20th century rows of apartments of similar height.

== Location ==
The square is within the SE17 postcode district. The nearest tube station is Kennington, 500 m northwest, much closer than any other stations.

Pasley Park has a brief border with the north-west corner of the roads forming the square (not with the square itself) along that side which is named differently, as a continuous road, Chapter Road.

== Conservation and amenity improvements ==
The eastern side of Lorrimore Square, Chapter Road is in the Sutherland Square Conservation Area. Southwark Council, the local council, regulates any planning and development that can take place in this area.

Along with smaller communal grounds in Lorrimore Road, Carter Street, Fleming Cottages, Churchwarden House, Greig Terrace and Forsyth Gardens, the square is the subject of the Surrey Gardens Tenants' and Residents' Association who, as leaseholders, hold most of the legal responsibilities for the park in Lorrimore Square.
