= William Pye (sculptor) =

British sculptor

William Burns Pye (born 1938) is a British sculptor known particularly for his water sculptures.

== Biography ==
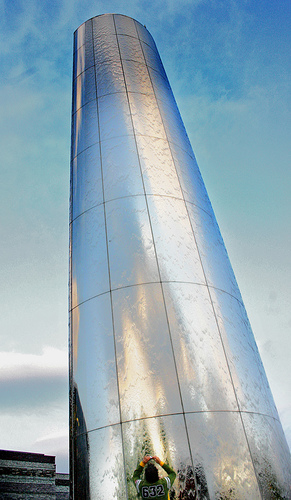
Water Tower by William Pye at the Wales Millennium Centre, Cardiff, Wales.

Pye is the son of Sir David Randall Pye FRS, a mechanical engineer and academic administrator. He attended the Dragon School in Oxford. He cites his aunt, sculptor Ethel Pye, as an early inspiration.

He undertook National Service between 1956 and 1958 then subsequently studied at Wimbledon School of Art (1958–61) and the Royal College of Art (1961–65). From 1965 to 1970 Pye taught at the Central School of Art before teaching at Goldsmiths, University of London for five years. In 1972, he was a visiting professor at California State University. He became known for his sculptures in metal, stone and especially water. In the 1960s, Pye's sculptures were abstract using metal and stone. In 1966 he had his first solo exhibition at the Redfern Gallery in London. Subsequent notable shows were held at Winchester in 1979 and Aberystwyth in 1980. In the 1970s, he produced abstract geometrical works using stainless steel, sometimes including kinetic aspects.

Pye has undertaken major commissions including:

- Zemran (1971), Stainless steel sculpture located on the Southbank Centre in London, which was listed Grade II on the advice of Historic England in 2016.
- Double Somersault (1976), Sculpture located outside Sheffield Children's Hospital.
- Jet Stream and Slipstream (both 1987), water sculptures at the North Terminal at Gatwick Airport, England
- A 13×70m wall of water and the entrance at the British Pavilion of the Seville Expo '92 at Seville, Spain (1992)
- Tetra Trellis (1993), a tetrahedron-shaped water sculpture in stainless steel water sculpture at the Tetra Pak UK Headquarters
- Derby Cascade (1995), Market Square, Derby, England
- Kanagawa or The Wave (2000), a sculpture in bronze on the Chichester Road (B2145), Selsey, West Sussex. A breaking wave echoing the Hokusai print 'The Hollow of the Deep Sea Wave off Kanagawa', including a patch of pebbles.
- Vannpaviljong (2011), Stromso Square, Drammen, Norway
- Salisbury Cathedral font. Consecrated 2008 for 750th anniversary of completion of cathedral.

Pye's sculptures are also to be found at Antony House and The Vineyard Hotel. He has had many exhibitions of his sculptures in the UK and elsewhere since his first solo exhibition in 1966. He has received many awards, including being elected Honorary Fellow of the Royal Institute of British Architects in 1993.

In 2016 Pye's water sculpture Alchemilla was unveiled at the All England Lawn Tennis and Croquet Club in Wimbledon on the first day of the 2016 Wimbledon Championships.
