= David Pye (engineer) =

British mechanical engineer and academic administrator (1886–1960)

Sir David Pye CB FRS
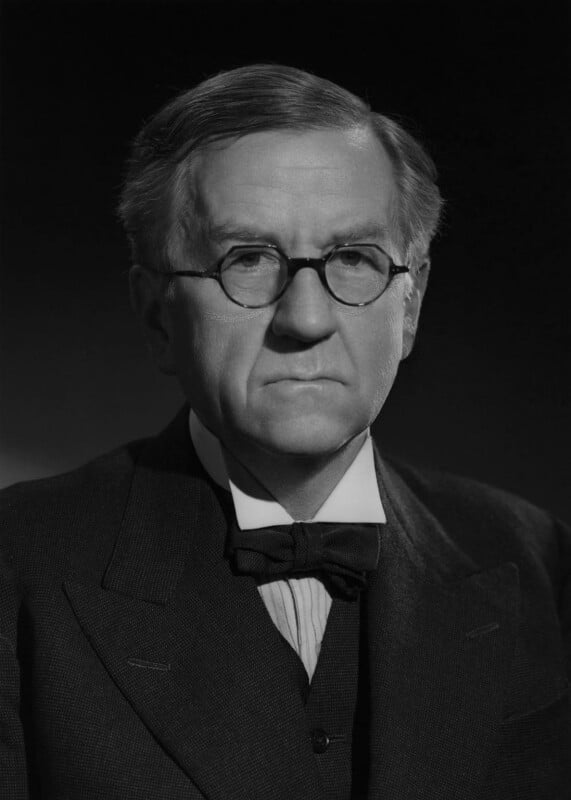
- Pye in 1948
- Born: David Randall Pye; 29 April 1886
- Died: 20 February 1960 (aged 73)
- Citizenship: United Kingdom

Academic background
- Education: Tonbridge School
- Alma mater: Trinity College, Cambridge

Academic work
- Discipline: Engineer
- Sub-discipline: Mechanical engineering; internal combustion engine; aeronautics
- Institutions: Department of Engineering Science, University of Oxford; New College, Oxford; Department of Engineering, University of Cambridge; Trinity College, Cambridge; Air Ministry; University College, London
- Military career
- Allegiance: United Kingdom
- Branch: British Army; Royal Air Force
- Unit: Royal Flying Corps
- Conflicts: First World War

Sir David Randall Pye CB FRS (29 April 1886 – 20 February 1960) was a British mechanical engineer and academic administrator. He served as Provost of University College London from 1942 to 1951.

== Biography ==
Pye was born in Hampstead, London, England. He was educated at Tonbridge School, a private school in Kent. He studied the mechanical sciences tripos at Trinity College, Cambridge, graduating with a third class honours Bachelor of Arts (BA) degree in 1908.

In 1909, he joined the Department of Engineering Science, University of Oxford as a lecturer: he had been invited to Oxford by C. F. Jenkin, the newly appointed Professor of Engineering Science. He was elected a Fellow of New College, Oxford in 1911. On 13 February 1912, he was commissioned into the Oxford University Officers' Training Corps as a second lieutenant. From 1915 to 1916, he taught at Winchester College, an all-boys boarding school in Hampshire.

From 1916 to 1919, he undertook service during the First World War in the Royal Flying Corps and Royal Air Force. After training, he was appointed an equipment officer 3rd class. He was promoted to temporary lieutenant on 13 October 1917, and to temporary captain on 6 April 1918. On 26 March 1918, he was appointed an experimental officer 1st class. He was demobilised on 1 April 1919.

In 1919, after the end of the War, Pye returned to his alma mater as a lecturer in engineering at the University of Cambridge and a Fellow of Trinity College, Cambridge. Amongst his research was work on the internal combustion engine. In 1925, he left Cambridge to join the Air Ministry as deputy director of scientific research under H. E. Wimperis. He was promoted to director in 1937. In the 1937 Coronation Honours, he was appointed Companion of the Order of the Bath (CB) in recognition of his work at the Air Ministry.

=== Involvement with Operation Chastise ===
In February 1940, Pye initiated an ad hoc group within the Ministry of Aircraft Production, comprising four civilian scientists and one air commodore: this was the Aerial Attack on Dams Advisory Committee (AAD). Pye had previously discussed this issue with Barnes Wallis.

=== Post war ===
Pye was appointed Provost of University College, London (UCL) in 1942. From 1943 to 1946, he was a member of the Aeronautical Research Council. He led UCL in reorganising and rebuilding in the aftermath of the Second World War. He retired in 1951 due to illness, and was made a Knight Bachelor in the 1952 New Year Honours. Whilst at UCL, students named a newspaper after him, Pi, which remains a core UCL publication to this day. Pye endorsed the paper, recognising that it filled a distinct hole in UCL student life after the Second World War. Pye noted his pleasure with the fact that a 'newspaper specially adapted to the needs and interest of students, postgraduates as well as the undergraduate' which could act as a 'medium through which to promote a sense of corporate interest which embraces all the varied activities in the College' was now available on campus.

In the 1955 film The Dam Busters, Pye was played by Stanley van Beers. David Pye was the father of William Pye, a noted sculptor.

== Selected works ==
- Tiddy, R. J. E. (1923). Thompson, R. S.; Pye, D. R. (eds.). The Mummers' Play. Oxford: Clarendon Press.
- Pye, D. R. (1927). George Leigh Mallory: A memoir. Oxford: Oxford University Press.
- Pye, D. R. (1937). The Internal Combustion Engine. Oxford: Oxford University Press.

== See also ==
- Frank Whittle

Academic offices
Preceded by Allen Mawer	Provost of University College London; 1942–1951	Succeeded by B. Ifor Evans
