= David Pye (furniture designer) =

David William Pye OBE (18 November 1914 – 1 January 1993), was Professor of Furniture Design at The Royal College of Art, 1964–1974. Among his pupils were David Colwell (Trannon), Richard la Trobe Bateman, Charles Dillon, Jane Dillon, Floris van den Broecke and Roger Dean. Pye was an accomplished wood-turner and carver, but also worked on the theory of design and handcraft. In 1991 he was awarded the Sir Misha Black award and was added to the College of Medallists.

== Works on the theory of design and handcraft ==
In the 1960s Pye wrote two major and influential works:

- The Nature of Design (later The Nature & Aesthetics of Design), 1964 (ISBN 0-906969-27-1)
- The Nature and Art of Workmanship, 1968 (ISBN 1-871569-76-1)

One of Pye's best known concepts is "the workmanship of risk", by which he means "workmanship using any kind of technique or apparatus, in which the quality of the result is not predetermined, but depends on the judgment, dexterity and care which the maker exercises as he works" (The Nature and Art of Workmanship, p. 4).

Pye proposed that we build things to effect change. Everything occurs within a system of changes and structures and is not divisible from the system in which it operates. Most designed objects are, in his opinion, purely palliative, and very few objects truly enable new activities and behavior. We can walk instead of taking the car but we cannot fly instead of taking a plane. He also points out that design is limited by economy not technique. Technique far outstrips affordability. Because of this all design is a trade off and to that extent a failure. Where that failure is allowed to enter in is an arbitrary result of the process of designing. He points out that much of design proceeds under the assumption that tools can bring us happiness but in his opinion tools can only avoid unhappiness. In thinking that tools can equate to happiness the tools are seen as separating cause and effect which are inseparable. This belief is held because design is conceived at a certain level of isolation from outside factors, an isolation which does not or cannot exist in the world.
