= Alley (surname) =

Alley is a surname. Notable people with the surname include:

- Anthea Alley (1927–1993), British sculptor
- Allen Alley (born 1954), American businessman and politician
- Alphonse Alley (1930–1987), Beninese political figure
- Bill Alley (1919–2004), Australian cricket player
- Cal Alley (1915–1970), American editorial cartoonist
- Candice Alley (born 1982), Australian singer-songwriter
- Carroll Alley (1928–2016), American physicist
- Chelsea Alley (born 1982), New Zealand rugby player
- Don Alley (1945–2020), American football player
- Ernest Alley (1904–1971), American football player
- Fred Alley (1962–2001), American lyricist
- Gene Alley (born 1940), American baseball player
- Geoff Alley (1903–1986), New Zealand rugby player
- George Alley (died 1912), Irish Methodist
- Henry Alley (born 1945), American writer
- Jennifer Alley, American basketball coach
- Jerome Alley (1760–1826), Irish poet and author
- John B. Alley (1817–1896), American politician and businessman
- Keirsten Alley (born 1973), American tennis player
- Kim Alley (born 1965), American modeling agent
- Kirstie Alley (1951–2022), American actress and comedian
- Larry Alley (born 1948), American politician
- Lindsey Alley (born 1977), American actress and singer
- Miko Alley, American-Filipino footballer
- Phil Alley (born 1970), Australian cricket player
- Rewi Alley (1897–1987), New Zealand writer
- Richard Alley (born 1957), American geologist
- Rick Alley (born 1963), American poet
- Ronald Alley (1926–1999), British art historian and curator
- Shelly Lee Alley (1894–1964), American singer, musician, songwriter and western swing bandleader
- Stephen Alley (1876–1969), British mechanical engineer and secret agent
- Steve Alley (born 1953), American ice hockey player
- T. W. Alley (1942–1993), American football player and coach
- Taylor Alley, American rugby player
- Ted Alley (1881–1949), Australian footballer
- Thomas Alley (born 1946), American politician
- Tom Alley (1889–1953), American racing driver
- Vernon Alley (1915–2004), American jazz musician
- Wayne Alley (born 1932), American judge
- William Alley (1510–1570), Anglican prelate
- William Alley (athlete) (born 1936), American javelin thrower
- William Nassau Alley (1808–1849), Irish methodist
- Zeb Alley (1928–2013), American lawyer, lobbyist, and politician
