= List of gay, lesbian or bisexual people: A =

This is a partial list of notable people who were or are gay men, lesbian or bisexual.

The historical concept and definition of sexual orientation varies and has changed greatly over time; for example the general term "gay" wasn't used to describe sexual orientation until the mid-20th century. A number of different classification schemes have been used to describe sexual orientation since the mid-19th century, and scholars have often defined the term "sexual orientation" in divergent ways. Indeed, several studies have found that much of the research about sexual orientation has failed to define the term at all, making it difficult to reconcile the results of different studies. However, most definitions include a psychological component (such as the direction of an individual's erotic desire) and/or a behavioural component (which focuses on the sex of the individual's sexual partner/s). Some prefer to simply follow an individual's self-definition or identity.

The high prevalence of people from the West on this list may be due to societal attitudes toward homosexuality. The Pew Research Center's 2013 Global Attitudes Survey found that there is "greater acceptance in more secular and affluent countries," with "publics in 39 countries [having] broad acceptance of homosexuality in North America, the European Union, and much of Latin America, but equally widespread rejection in predominantly Muslim nations and in Africa, as well as in parts of Asia and in Russia. Opinion about the acceptability of homosexuality is divided in Israel, Poland and Bolivia." As of 2013, Americans are divided – a majority (60 percent) believes homosexuality should be accepted, while 33 percent disagree.

== A ==
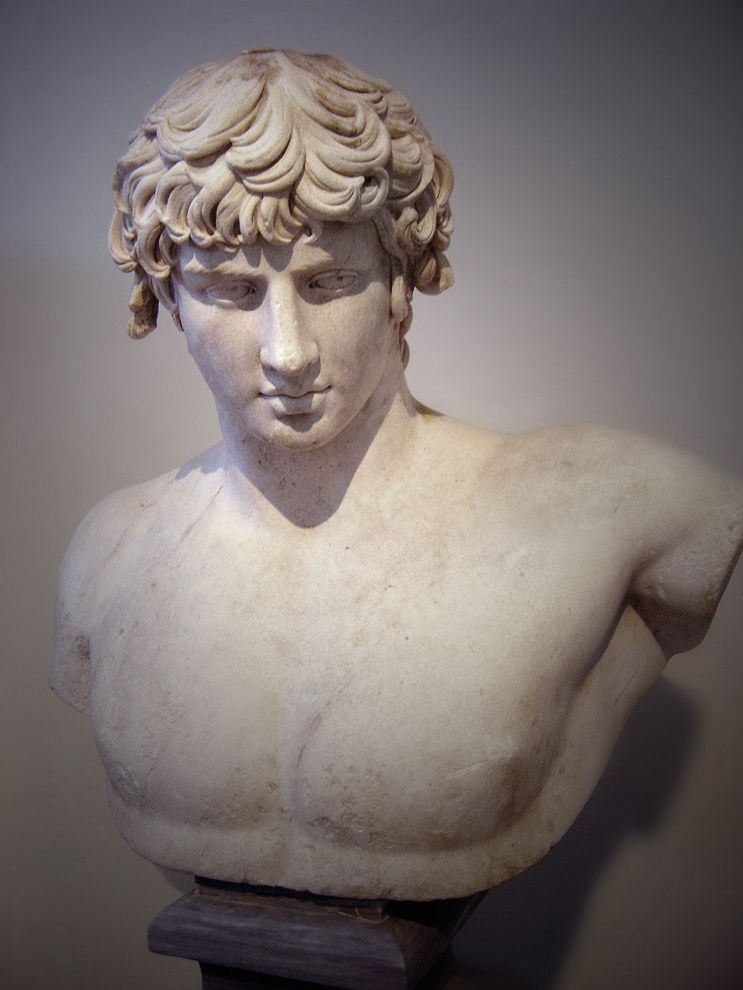
Greek figure Antinous

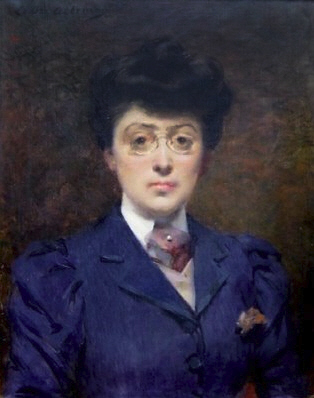
French artist Louise Abbéma

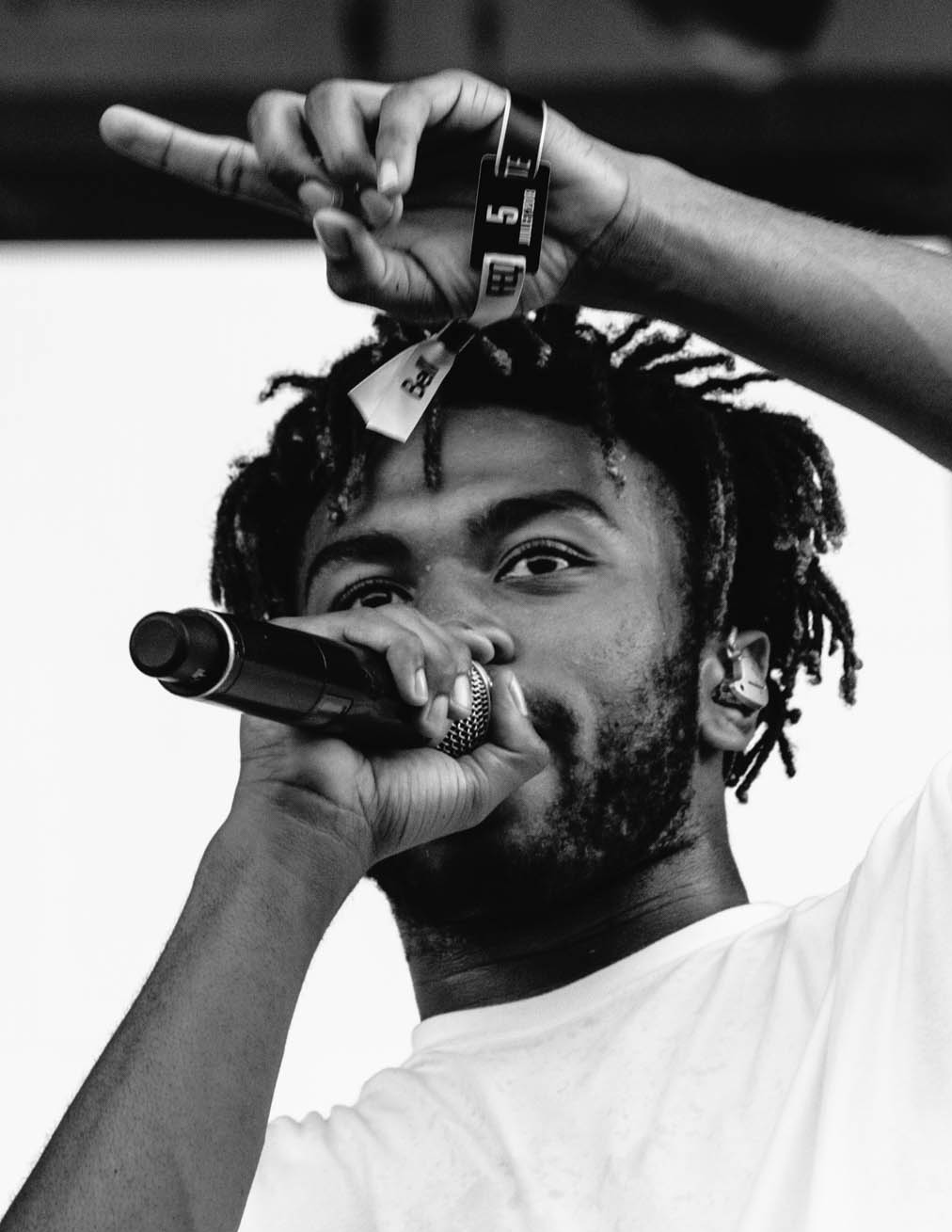
American rapper and musician Kevin Abstract

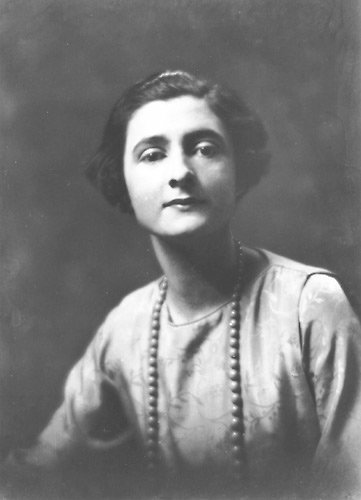
American writer and socialite Mercedes de Acosta

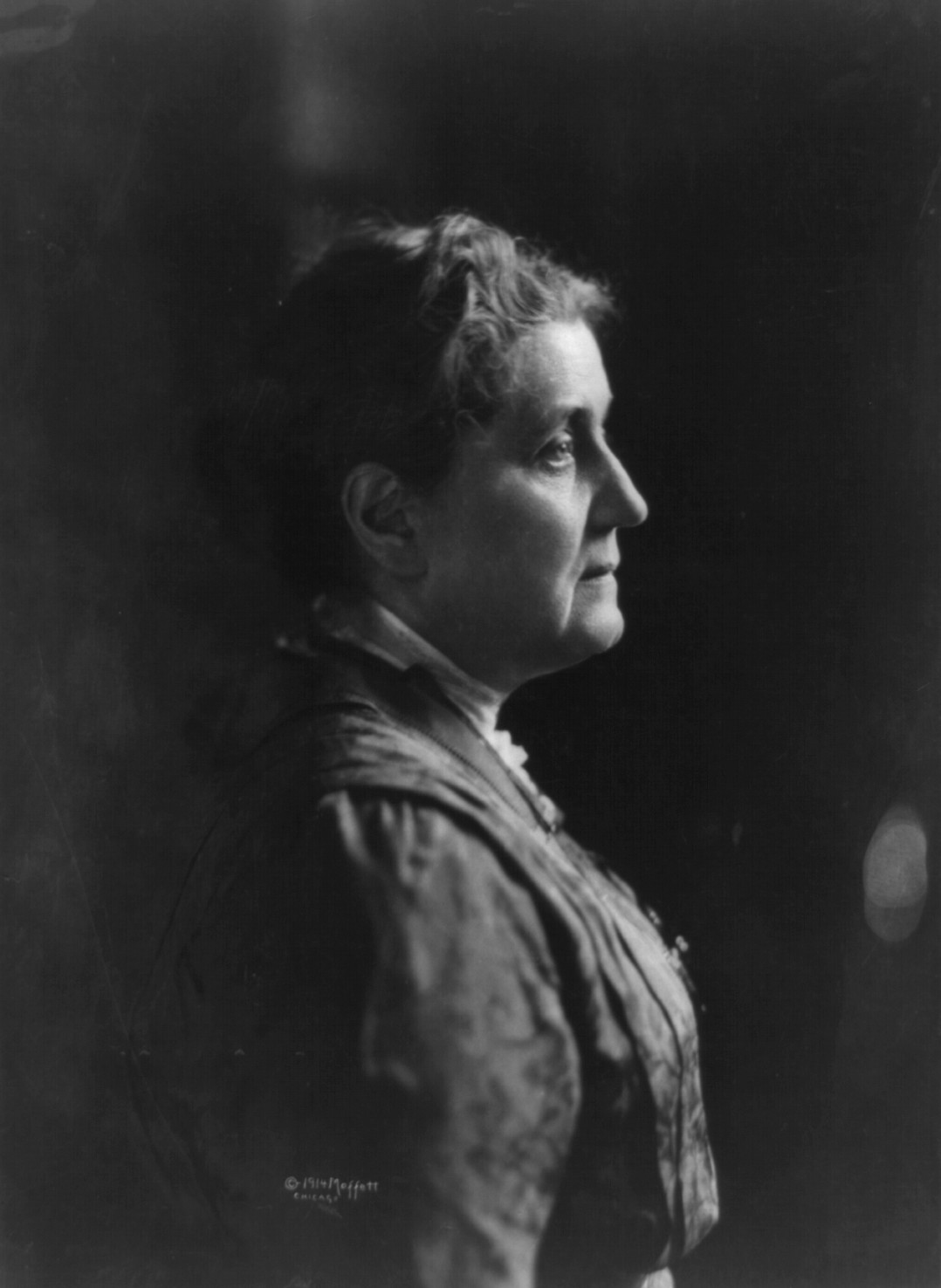
American social reformer Jane Addams

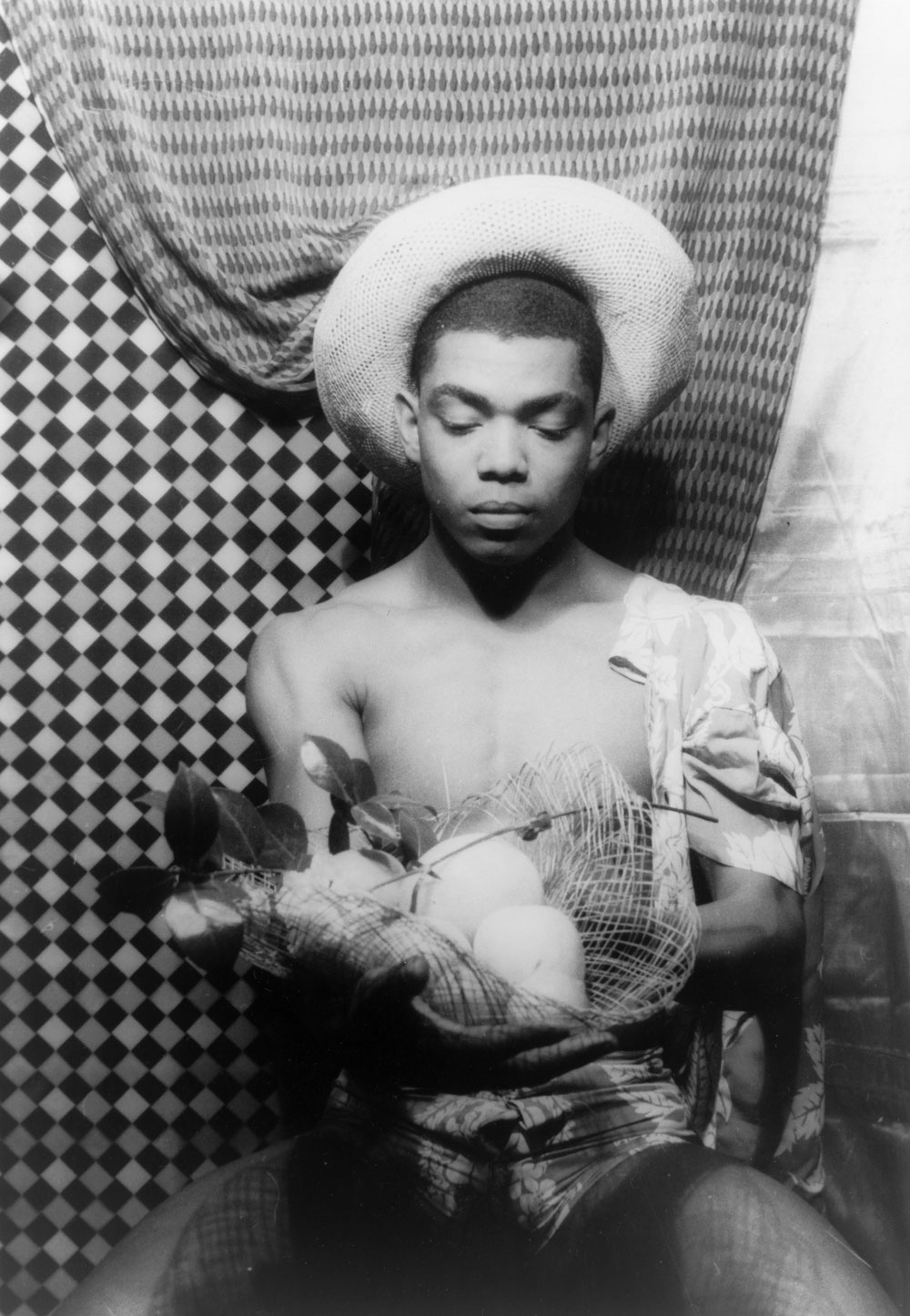
American dancer and choreographer Alvin Ailey

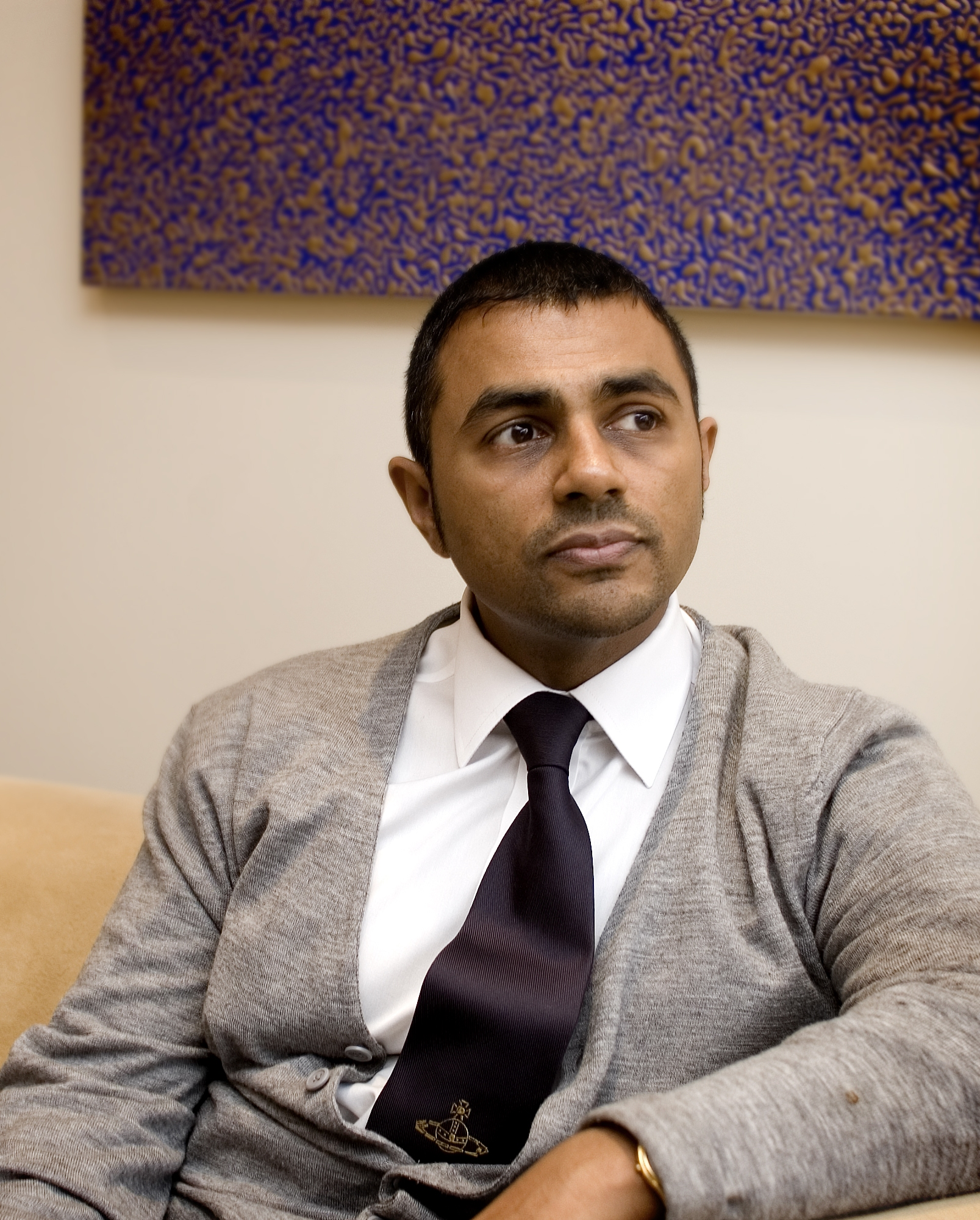
British media entrepreneur and politician Waheed Ali

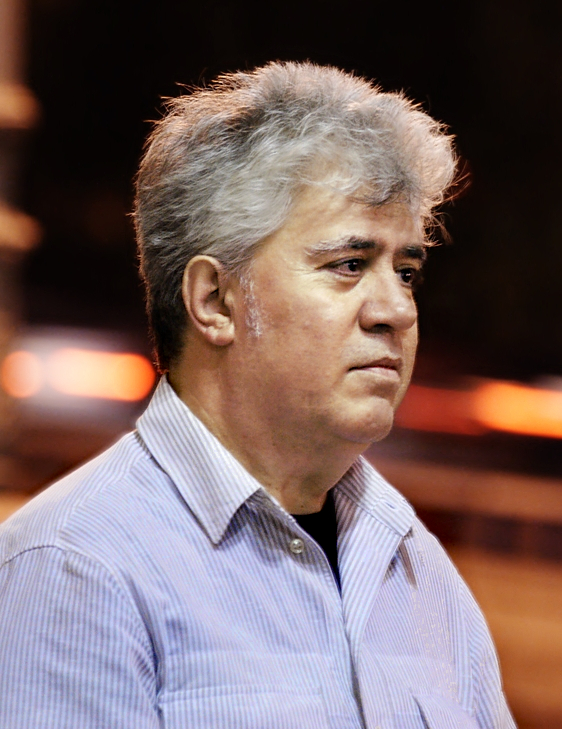
Spanish film director Pedro Almodóvar

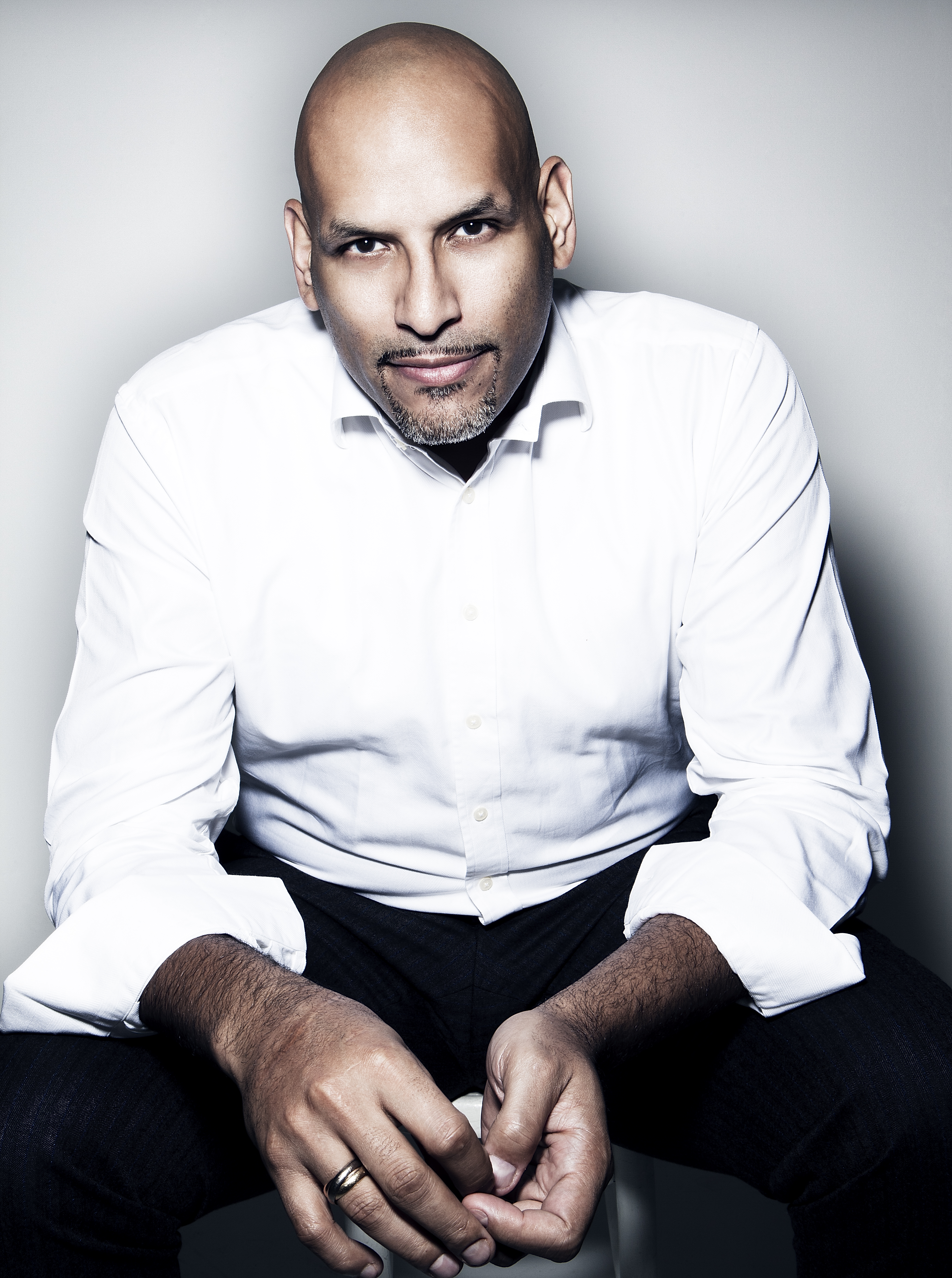
British basketball player and psychologist John Amaechi

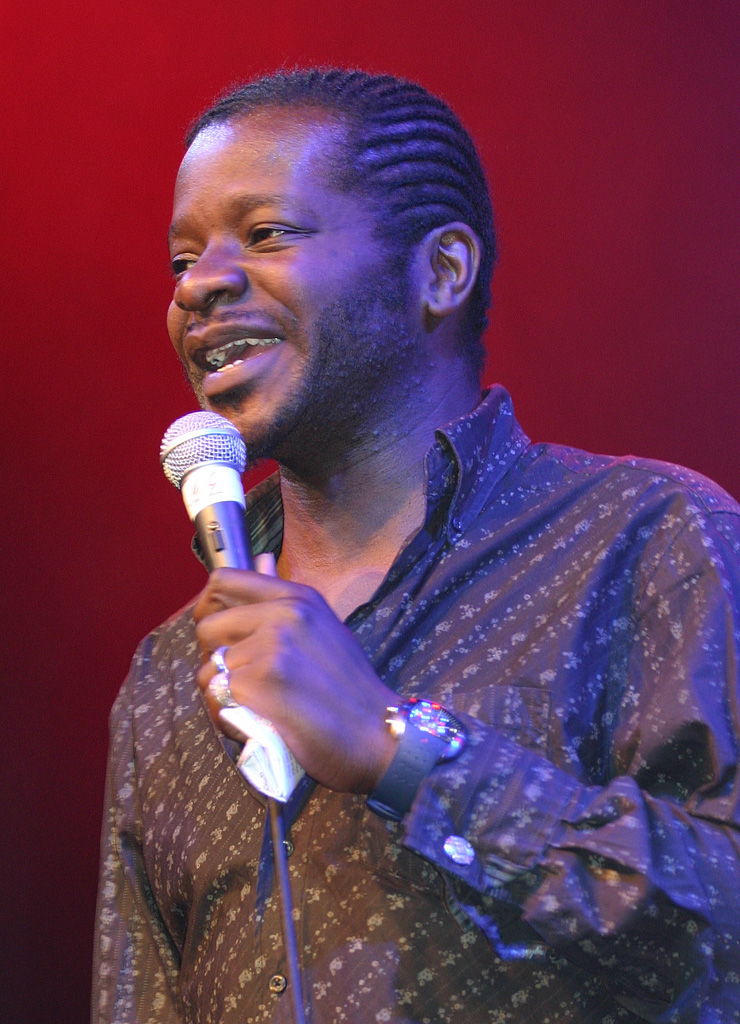
British comedian Stephen K. Amos

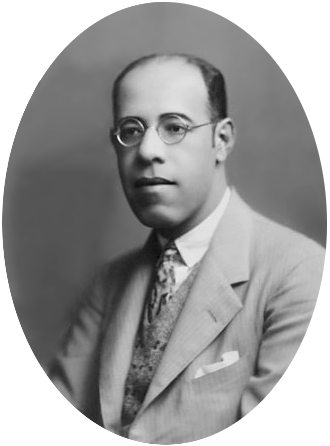
Brazilian poet, novelist, musicologist, art historian and critic, and photographer Mário de Andrade

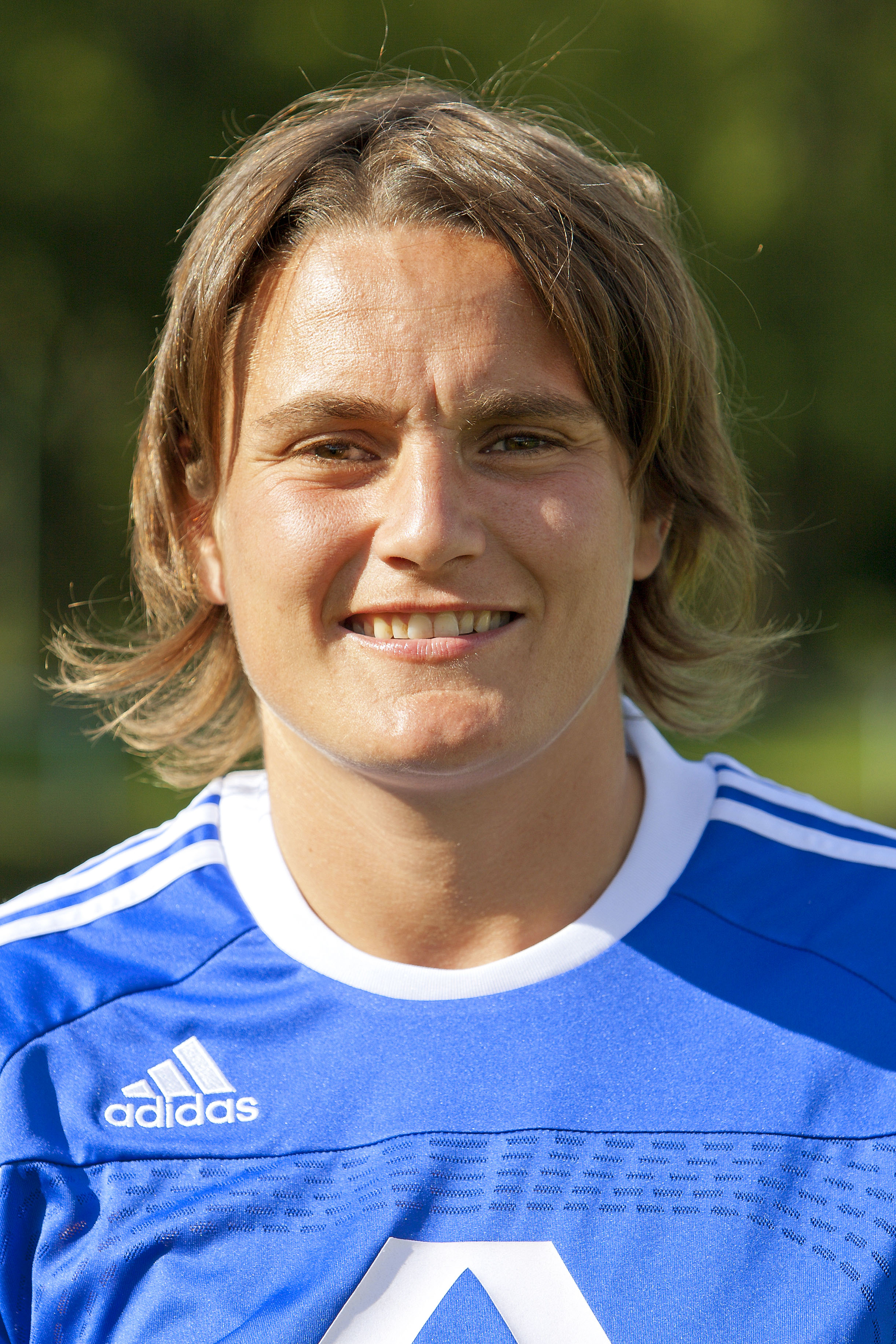
German footballer Nadine Angerer

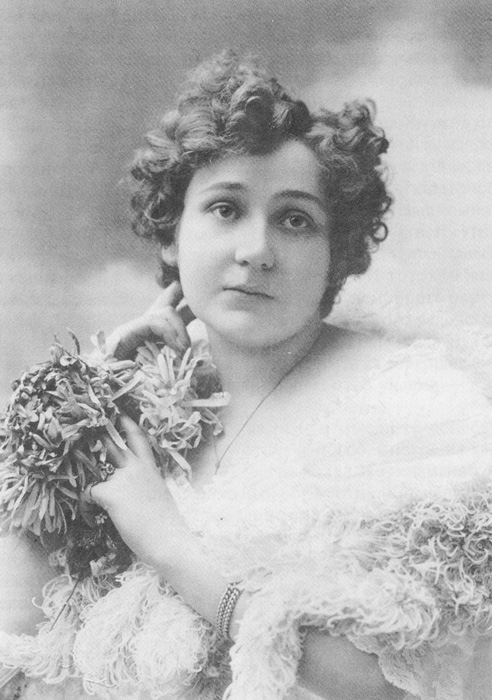
Russian opera singer Concordia Antarova

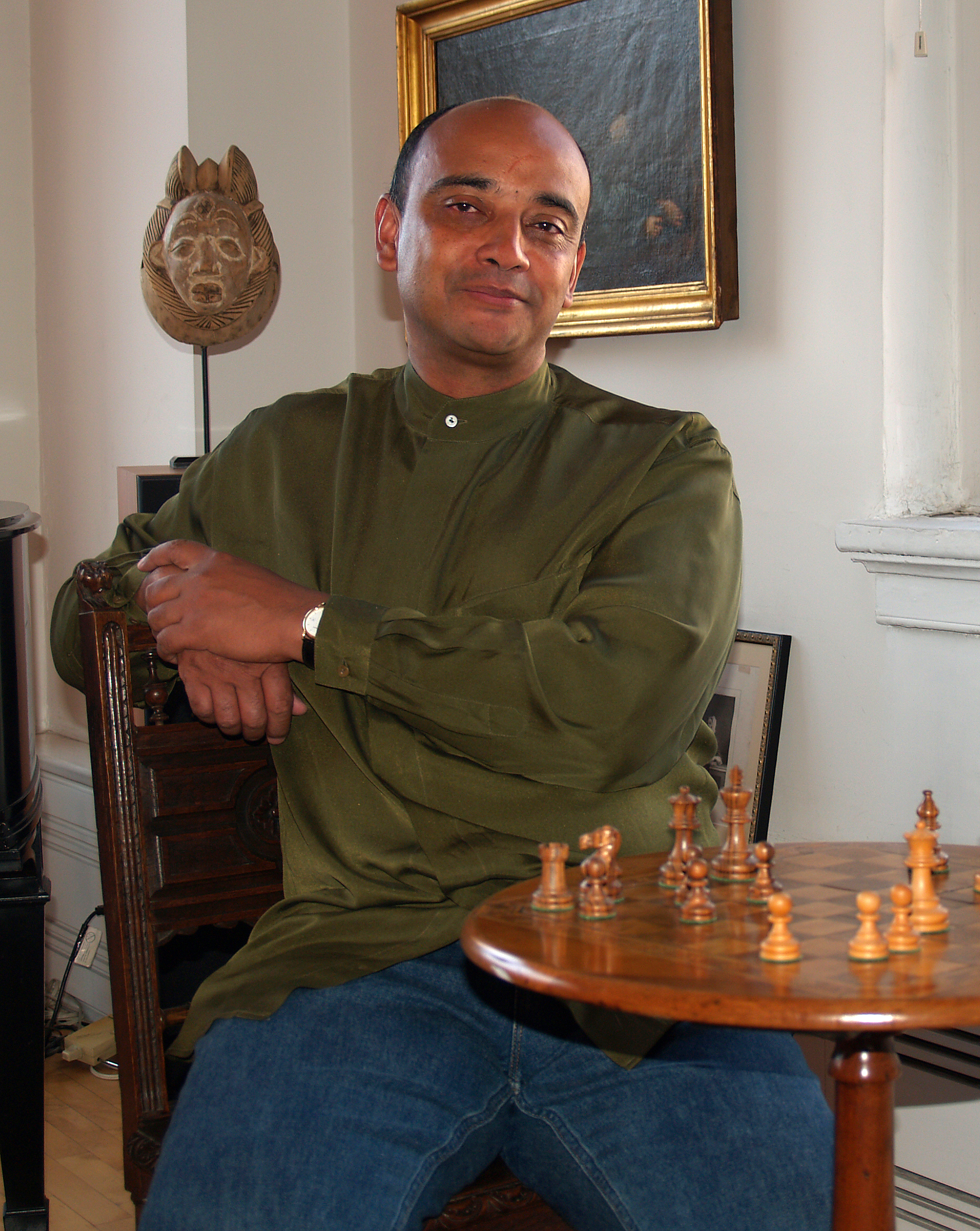
Ghanaian philosopher Kwame Anthony Appiah

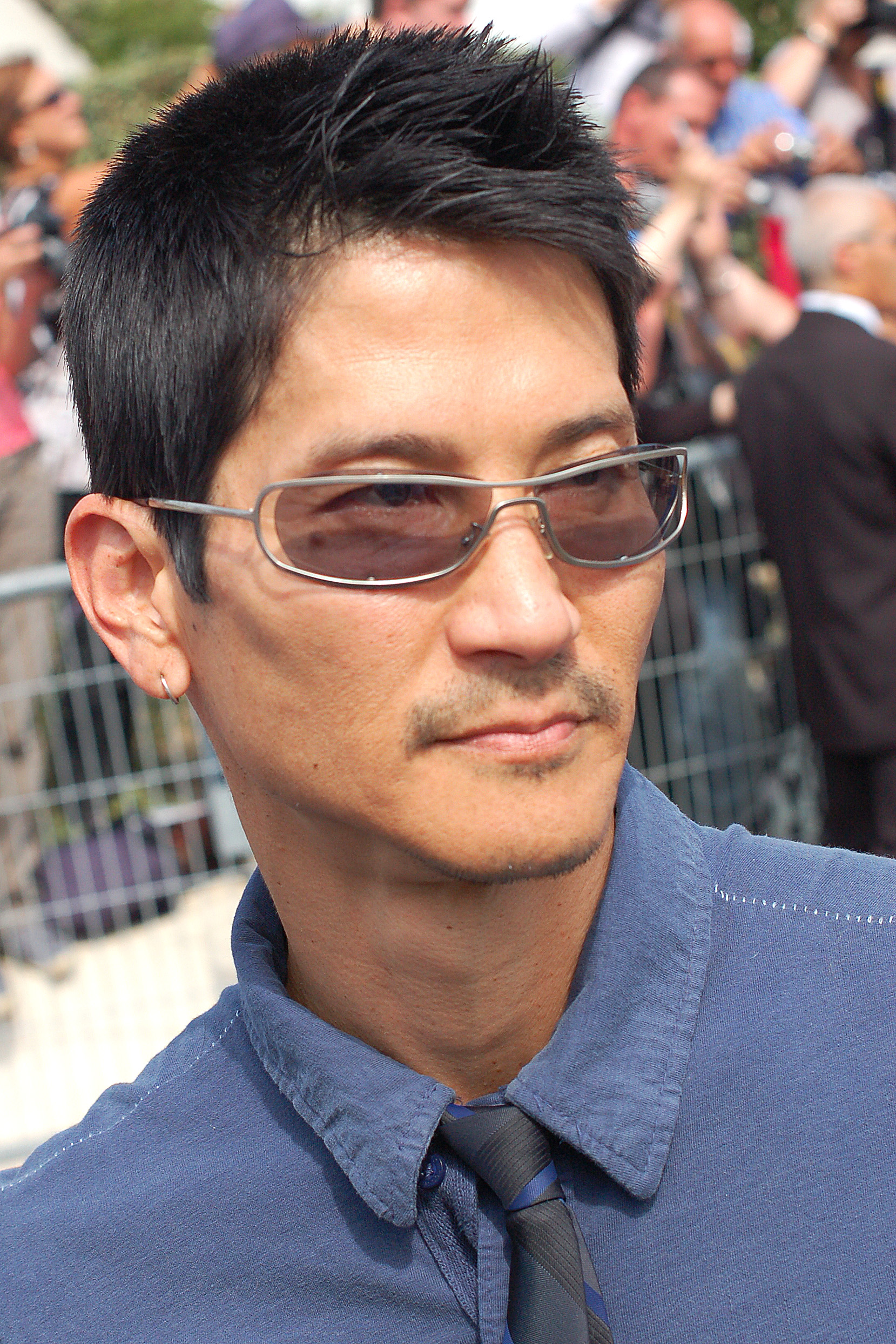
American filmmaker Gregg Araki

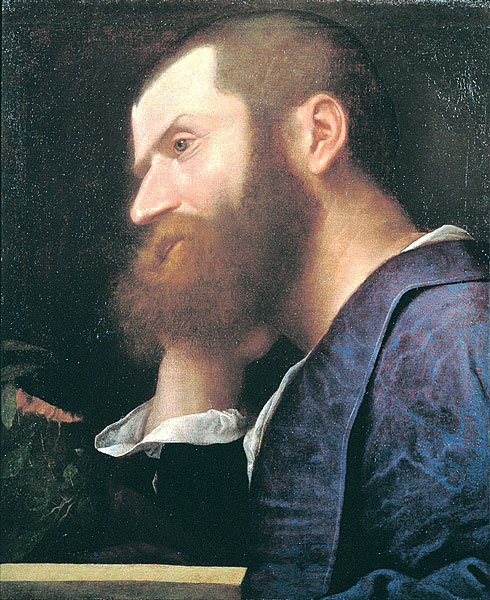
Italian writer Pietro Aretino, as painted by Titian

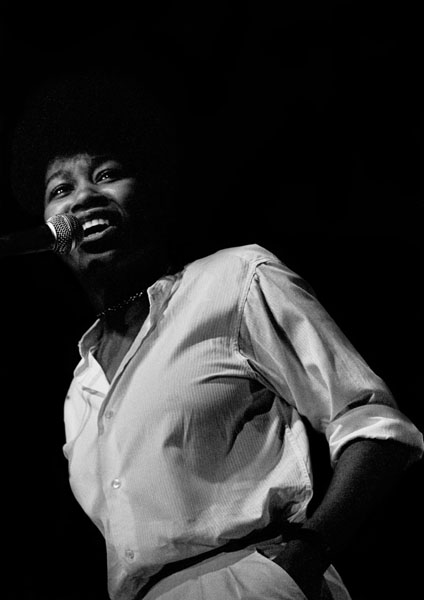
Kittian-British singer-songwriter Joan Armatrading

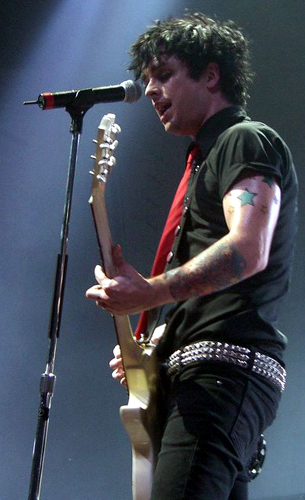
American singer Billie Joe Armstrong

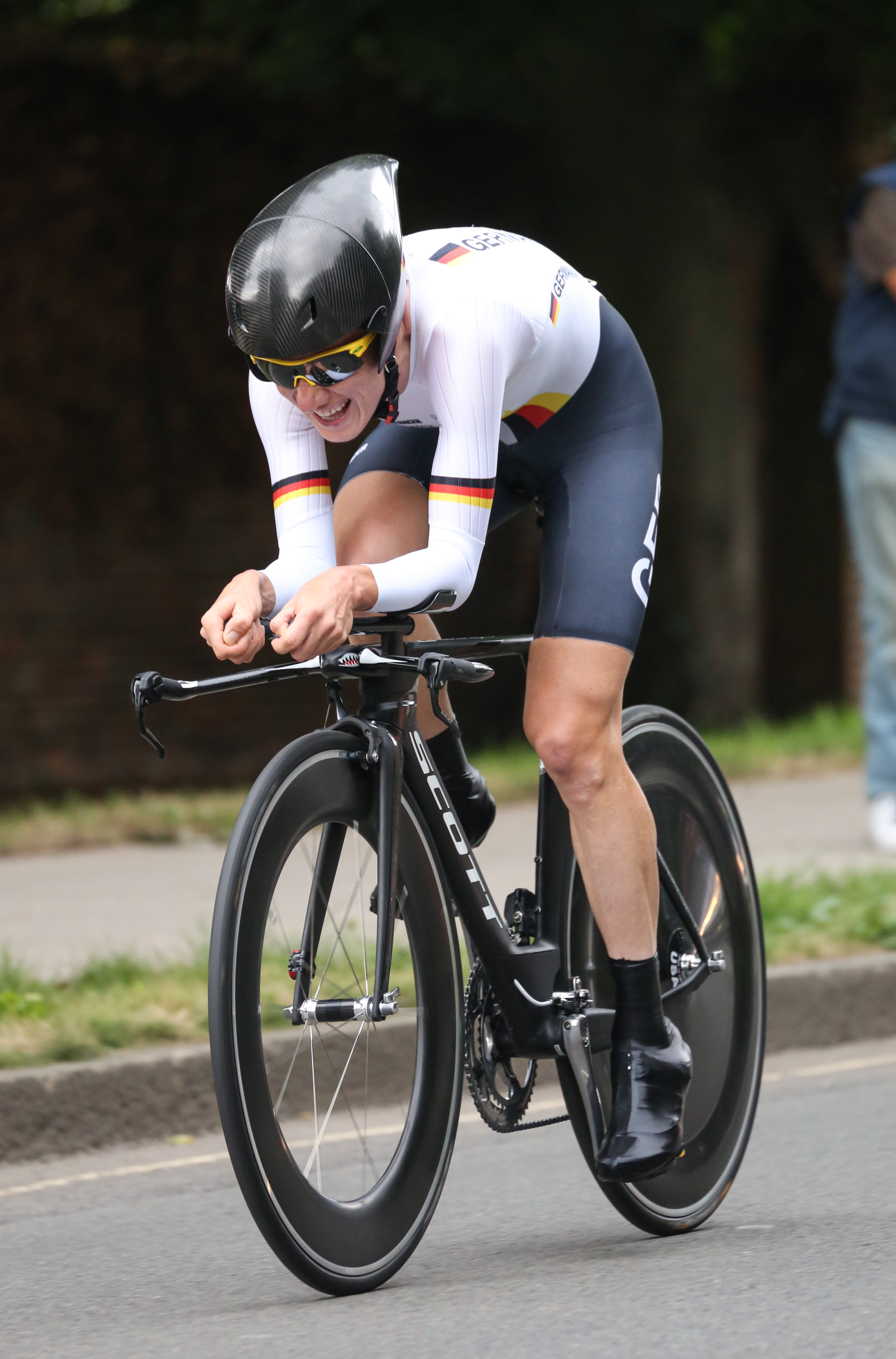
German cyclist Judith Arndt

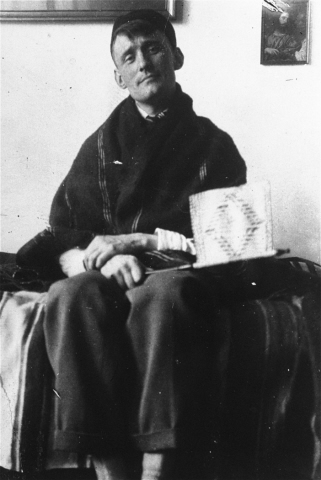
Dutch artist, author and WWII Resistance member Willem Arondeus

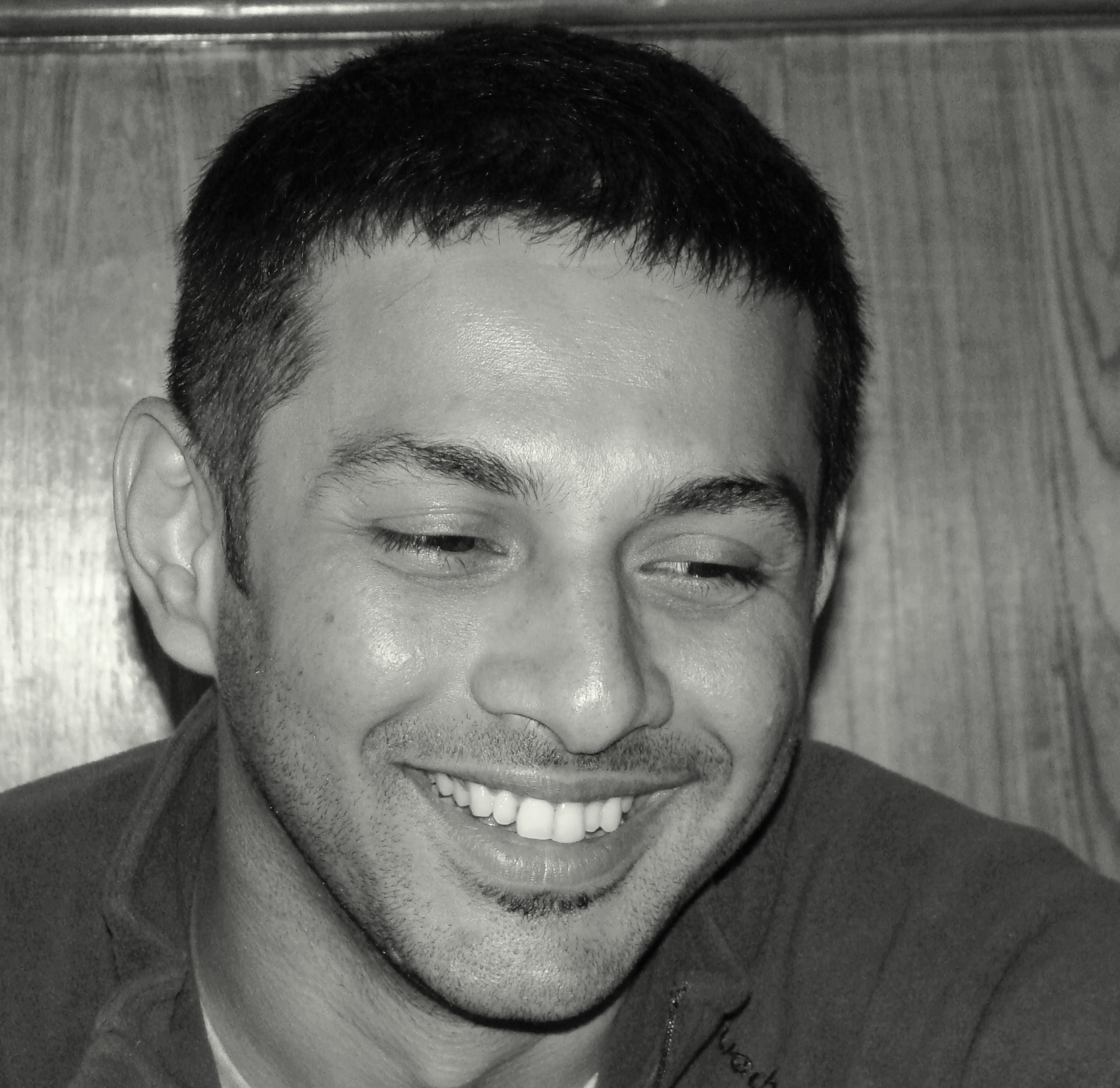
Indian filmmaker Apurva Asrani

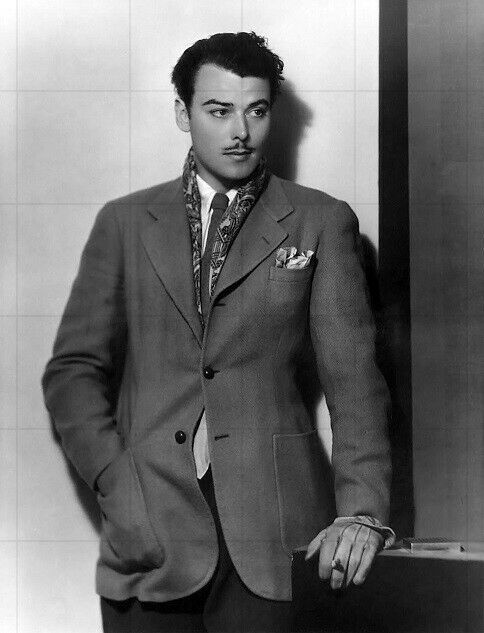
Swedish actor Nils Asther

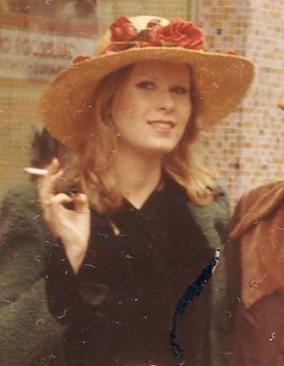
Swedish Jewelry designer, singer, dancer and model Efva Attling

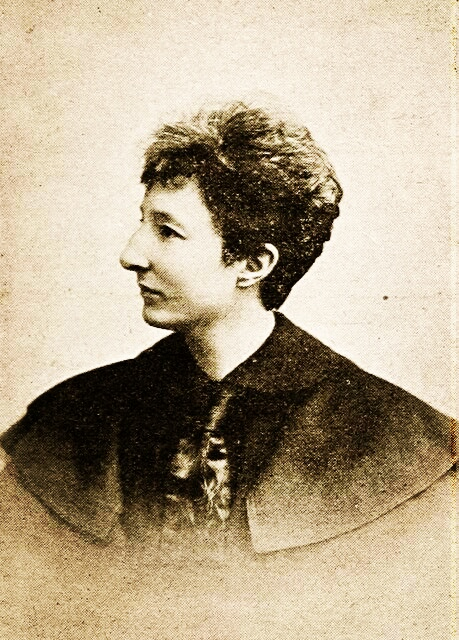
German jurist, writer, feminist and pacifist Anita Augspurg

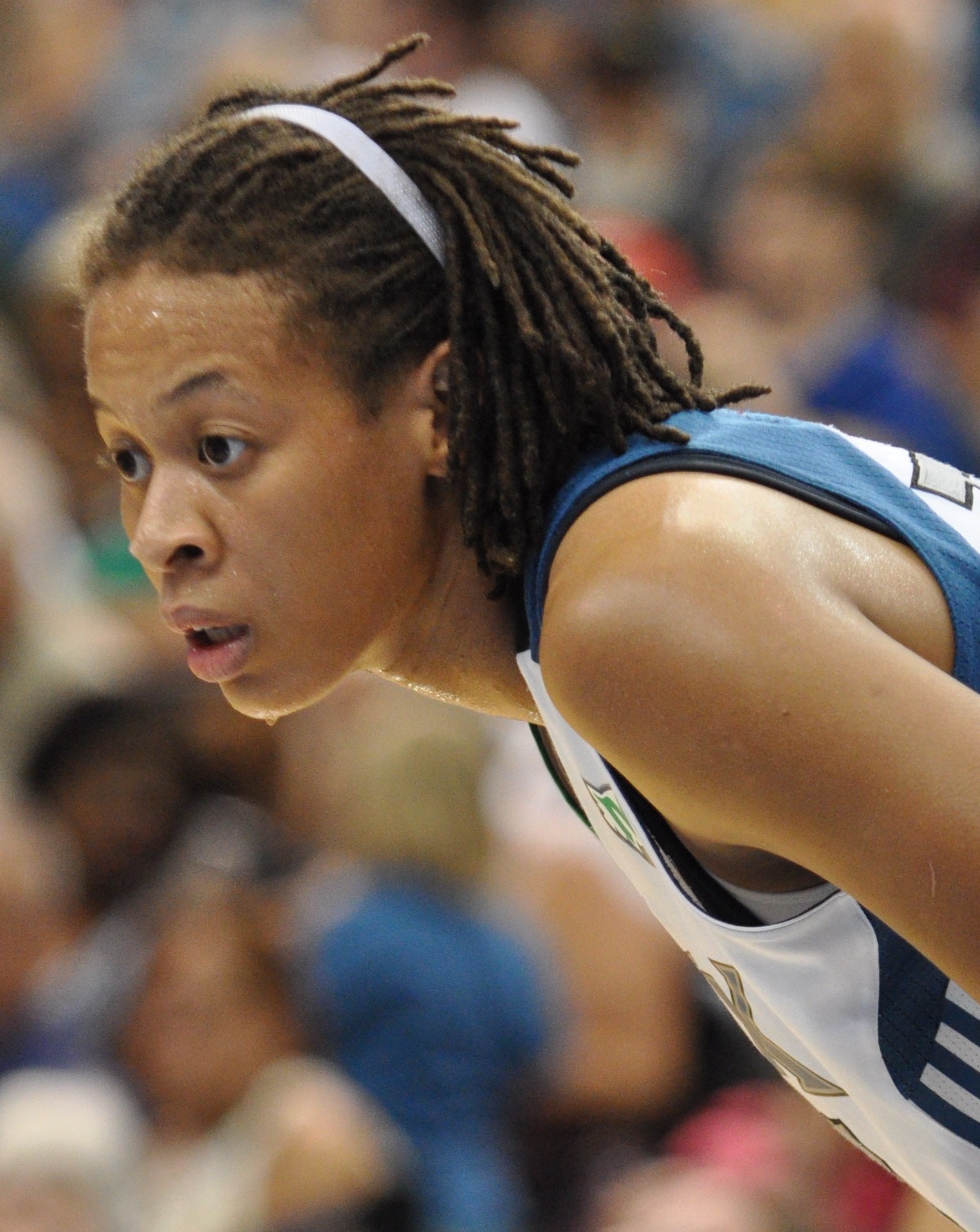
American basketball player Seimone Augustus

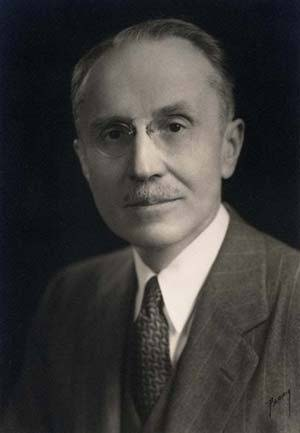
Russian entomologist, lepidopterist, botanist, artist and art critic Andrey Avinoff

Name	Lifetime	Nationality	Notable as	Notes
Janet Aalfs	b. 1956	American	Martial artist, poet	L
Saara Aalto	b. 1987	Finnish	Pop singer	L
William Aalto	1915–1958	American	Writer, soldier	G
Leroy F. Aarons	1933–2004	American	Journalist	G
Anne Aasheim	1962–2016	Norwegian	Journalist, editor	L
Louise Abbéma	1853–1927	French	Painter, designer	L
Berenice Abbott	1898–1991	American	Photographer	L
Sidney Abbott	1937–2015	American	Feminist, lesbian activist	L
Khalid Abdel-Hadi	b. 1989	Jordanian	LGBT rights activist, magazine founder, model	G
Reza Abdoh	1963–1995	Iranian-American	Theater director, playwright	G
Daayiee Abdullah	1954–2025	American	Imam, Muslim activist	G
Henry D. Abelove	b. ?	American	Academic, literary scholar	G
Helena Åberg	b. 1971	Swedish	Freestyle swimmer	L
Joseph Friedrich Abert	1879–1959	German	Historian, archivist	G
Paula Aboud	b. 1950	American	Politician, activist	L
Caio Fernando Abreu	1948–1996	Brazilian	Writer	G
Kevin Abstract	b. 1996	American	Rapper (Brockhampton)	G
Ahmad Abu Murkhiyeh	1996/1997–2022	Palestinian	Murder victim	G
Boy Abunda	b. 1955	Filipino	Journalist	G
Nicole Abusharif	b. 1980	American	Convicted murderer	L
Gabriel Acevero	b. 1990	Trinidadian-American	Organizer, activist, politician	G
Eleanor D. Acheson	b. 1947	American	Lawyer	L
Midi Achmat	b. ?	South African	LGBT activist, sister of Zackie Achmat	L
Zackie Achmat	b. 1962	South African	LGBT and AIDS activist, brother of Midi Achmat	G
Roberta Achtenberg	b. 1950	American	Politician	L
Marc Acito	b. 1966	American	Author	G
Jean Acker	1893–1978	American	Actor, wife of actor Rudolph Valentino	L
Kathy Acker	1949–1997	American	Writer, feminist	B
J. R. Ackerley	1896–1967	English	Writer, arts editor of The Listener	G
Gerald M. Ackerman	1928–2016	American	Art historian	G
Graham Ackerman	b. 1983	American	Gymnast	G
Peter Ackroyd	b. 1949	English	Biographer, novelist, critic	G
Mercedes de Acosta	1893–1968	American	Writer, socialite	L
Harold Acton	1904–1994	British	Art writer, aesthete	G
Gilbert Adair	1944–2011	Scottish	Novelist, poet, film critic, journalist	G
Peter Adair	1943–1996	American	Filmmaker, artist	G
Barry D. Adam	b. 1952	Canadian	Sociologist	G
Margie Adam	b. 1947	American	Composer, women's music performer	L
Katarzyna Adamik	b. 1972	Polish	Film director	L
Mark Adamo	b. 1962	American	Classical music composer	G
Dallas Adams	1947–1991	English	Actor	G
John Bodkin Adams	1899–1983	Northern Irish	Doctor, suspected serial killer	G
Maude Adams	1872–1953	American	Actor	L
Nicola Adams	b. 1982	English	Boxer	B
Richard Adams	1947–2012	Filipino-American	Activist	G
Sam Adams	b. 1963	American	First openly gay Portland, Oregon City Council member, first openly gay mayor of a major US city (Portland)	G
Thom Adcox-Hernandez	b. ?	American	Voice actor	G
Jane Addams	1860–1935	American	Social reformer, Nobel prize winner	L
Gaye Adegbalola	b. 1944	American	Blues musician	B
Jacques d'Adelswärd-Fersen	1880–1923	French	Aristocrat, writer	G
Amal Aden	b. 1983	Somali-Norwegian	Author, lecturer, lesbian activist	L
Thomas Adès	b. 1971	English	Composer	G
Pamela Adie	b. 1984	Nigerian	LGBT rights activist, public speaker, filmmaker	L
Allison Adler	b. 1967	American	TV writer, producer	L
Jonathan Adler	b. 1966	American	Interior designer	G
Etel Adnan	1925–2021	Lebanese-American	Poet, artist	L
Adolfo	1933–2021	Cuban-American	Fashion designer	G
James Adomian	b. 1980	American	Actor, comedian	G
Andrew Adonis	b. 1963	British	Politician	G
Adrian	1903–1959	American	Costume designer	G
Max Adrian	1903–1973	Northern Irish	Actor	G
Gösta Adrian-Nilsson	1884–1965	Swedish	Artist, writer	G
Sharon Afek	b. 1970	Israeli	Military general, lawyer	G
Rhammel Afflick	b. 1994	British	Writer, political activist	B
Patience Agbabi	b. 1965	British	Poet, performer	B
Ray Aghayan	1928–2011	Iranian	Fashion designer	G
Gabriel Aghion	b. 1955	French	Film director, screenwriter	G
Marilyn Agliotti	b. 1979	Dutch	Field hockey player	L
Faustina Agolley	b. 1984	Australian	TV presenter	L
Dominic Agostino	1959–2004	Canadian	Politician	G
Jessica Aguilar	b. 1982	Mexican-American	Mixed martial artist	L
Laura Aguilar	1959–2018	American	Photographer	L
Roberto Aguirre-Sacasa	b. 1971	American	Playwright, writer for Marvel Comics	G
Ah Toy	1829–1928	Chinese–American	Sex worker, madam	B
Tommy Ahlers	b. 1975	Danish	Politician	B
Andrew Ahn	b. 1986	American	Filmmaker	G
Michelle-Lee Ahye	b. 1992	Trinidadian	Sprinter	L
Emperor Ai of Han	27–1 BC	Chinese (Han dynasty)	Head of state	G
Clay Aiken	b. 1978	American	Singer, songwriter	G
Alvin Ailey	1931–1989	American	Dancer, choreographer	G
Jean-Jacques Aillagon	b. 1946	French	Politician	G
Dawn Airey	b. 1960	English	TV executive	L
Will Aitken	b. 1949	Canadian	Writer	G
Ajamu X	b. 1963	British	Artist	G
Chantal Akerman	1950–2015	Belgian	Filmmaker	L
Michael Akers	b. 1970	American	Filmmaker	G
Desiree Akhavan	b. 1984	American	Filmmaker, writer, actor	B
Manabe Akifusa	1666–1720	Japanese	Confidant and lover of Shōgun Tokugawa Ienobu	G
Richard Akuson	b. 1993	Nigerian	Lawyer, LGBTQ rights activist, essayist, editor, magazine founder	G
Magaly Alabau	b. 1945	Cuban-American	Poet, theatre director, actor	L
Michael Alago	b. 1960	American	Music executive, photographer, writer	G
Faisal Alam	b. 1977	American	LGBT Muslim rights activist	G
Rumaan Alam	b. 1977	Bangladeshi-American	Writer	G
Rabih Alameddine	b. 1959	Lebanese-American	Painter and writer	G
Francisco X. Alarcón	1954–2016	American	Poet, educator	G
Rolando Alarcón	1929–1973	Chilean	Folk musician, composer	G
Elissa Alarie	b. 1986	Canadian	Rugby union player	L
Leopoldo Alas Mínguez	1962–2008	Spanish	Author, poet	G
Edward Albee	1928–2016	American	Playwright	G
Matt Alber	b. 1978	American	Singer, songwriter	G
Niki Albon	b. 1992	English	YouTube personality, radio presenter, digital creator	G
Pablo Alborán	b. 1989	Spanish	Singer, songwriter, musician	G
Pearl Alcock	1934–2006	Jamaican-British	Club owner, outsider artist	B
John Alcorn	b. ?	Canadian	Jazz musician	G
Michael Aldred	1945–1995	English	Music producer, music journalist, TV presenter	G
Ben Aldridge	b. 1985	English	Actor	G
Sarah Aldridge	1911–2006	American	Author	L
Sibilla Aleramo	1876–1960	Italian	Writer	L
Cris Alexander	1920–2012	American	Actor, singer, dancer, designer, photographer	G
J. Alexander	b. 1958	American	Runway coach, TV personality	G
Olly Alexander	b. 1990	English	Musician, singer, songwriter (Years & Years), actor	G
Grand Duke Sergei Alexandrovich of Russia	1857–1905	Russian	Nobleman	G
Nikolay Alexeyev	b. 1977	Russian	LGBT rights activist, lawyer, journalist	G
Luis Alfaro	b. 1963	American	Performance artist, writer, theater director, social activist	G
Róbert Alföldi	b. 1967	Hungarian	Actor, director, TV personality	G
Francesco Algarotti	1712–1764	Italian	Polymath	B
Mohamed Abdulkarim Ali	b. 1985	Somali-Canadian	Writer	G
Yashar Ali	b. 1979	American	Journalist	G
Zhiar Ali	b. 1999	Iraqi	Animal rights activist, Kurdish advocate for LGBT rights	G
Michael Alig	1966–2020	American	Party promoter, murderer	G
Bisi Alimi	b. 1975	Nigerian	LGBT rights activist, HIV advocate	G
Napier Sturt, 3rd Baron Alington	1896–1940	English	Peer	B
Abdulrahman Alkhiary	1992/1993	Saudi-American	Journalist	G
Sandra Alland	b. 1973	Canadian	Writer, artist, activist	L
Julian Phelps Allan	1892–1996	English	Sculptor	L
Maud Allan	1873–1956	Canadian	Dancer	L
Marc Allégret	1900–1973	French	Film director	B
Julie Allemand	b. 1996	Belgian	Basketball player	L
Bob Allen	b. 1958	American	Politician	B
Chad Allen	b. 1974	American	Actor, LGBT activist	G
Donald Allen	1912–2004	American	Editor, publisher, translator	G
Lily Allen	b. 1985	English	Singer-songwriter, TV presenter	B
Paula Gunn Allen	1939–2008	American	Writer	L
Peter Allen	1944–1992	Australian	Entertainer	G
Ted Allen	b. 1965	American	Chef, TV personality	G
Tom Allen	b. 1983	English	Comedian	G
Wanda Jean Allen	1959–2001	American	Murderer, 1st black woman to be executed in the U.S. since 1954	L
Christian Wilhelm Allers	1857–1915	German	Painter	G
Henry Alley	b. 1944	American	Author, academic	G
Waheed Alli, Baron Alli	b. 1964	British	Businessman, first openly gay peer in Parliament	G
Dorothy Allison	1949–2024	American	Writer	L
Eric Allman	b. 1955	American	Computer programmer	G
Alma	b. 1996	Finnish	Pop singer	L
Carlos Almaraz	1941–1989	American	Painter, pioneer of the Chicano Movement	B
László Almásy	1895–1951	Hungarian	Explorer, spy	G
Néstor Almendros	1930–1992	Spanish	Cinematographer	G
Pedro Almodóvar	b. 1949	Spanish	Filmmaker	G
Marc Almond	b. 1957	English	Pop singer (Soft Cell)	G
Al-Mu'tamid ibn Abbad	1040–1095	Abbadid dynasty	Moorish king, poet	G
Anne-Marie Alonzo	1951–2005	Canadian	Writer	L
Rebecca Alpert	b. 1950	American	Rabbi, religious academic	L
Alpharad	b. 1995	American	YouTuber, esports personality, musician	B
Hilton Als	b. 1960	American	Writer, theater critic	G
Saud bin Abdulaziz bin Nasser Al Saud	b. 1977	Saudi Arabian	Prince, convicted murderer	G
Kamal Al-Solaylee	b. 1964	Yemeni-Canadian	Journalist, writer	G
Joseph Alsop	1910–1989	American	Journalist	G
Marin Alsop	b. 1956	American	Conductor, violinist	L
Vernetta Alston	b. ?	American	Politician, attorney	L
Bela Ewald Althans	b. 1966	German	Neo-Nazi activist	G
Marcella Althaus-Reid	1952–2009	Argentine	Theologian	B
Dennis Altman	b. 1943	Australian	Academic, LGBT rights activist	G
Sam Altman	b. 1985	American	Venture-capitalist	G
Joseph Altuzarra	b. 1983	French	Fashion designer	G
Noel Alumit	b. 1968	American	Novelist, actor, activist	G
Eric Alva	b. 1970	American	First Marine seriously injured in the Iraq War	G
Ángeles Álvarez	b. 1961	Spanish	Politician, feminist activist	L
Brian Jordan Alvarez	b. ?	American	Filmmaker, actor	G
Tyler Alvarez	b. 1997	American	Actor	G
Cecilia Álvarez-Correa Glen	b. 1953	Colombian	Politician, industrial engineer	L
Gustavo Álvarez Gardeazábal	b. 1945	Colombian	Writer, politician	G
Luisa Isabel Álvarez de Toledo, 21st Duchess of Medina Sidonia	1936–2008	Spanish	21st Duchess of Medina Sidonia	L
Renee Alway	b. 1986	American	Fashion model	L
John Amaechi	b. 1970	British	Basketball player, broadcaster	G
Knut Olav Åmås	b. 1968	Norwegian	Politician	G
Dan Amboyer	b. 1985	American	Actor	G
Javier Ambrossi	b. 1984	Spanish	Actor, stage and theater director	G
Scott Amedure	1963–1995	American	"Jenny Jones Murder" victim	G
Gianni Amelio	b. 1945	Italian	Film director	G
Alejandro Amenábar	b. 1972	Chilean-Spanish	Filmmaker	G
Paul America	1944–1982	American	Actor	B
David Ames	b. 1983	English	Actor	G
Shadi Amin	b. 1964	Iranian	Writer, activist, dissident	L
Thomas Ammann	1950–1993	Swiss	Art dealer and collector	G
Tom Ammiano	b. 1941	American	San Francisco City Supervisor, comedian	G
Simon Emil Ammitzbøll-Bille	b. 1977	Danish	Politician	B
Stephen K. Amos	b. 1967	English	Comedian, TV personality	G
Amplify Dot	b. 1988	English	Rapper, DJ, radio and TV presenter	L
Simon Amstell	b. 1979	English	Comedian, TV presenter	G
Elena Anaya	b. 1975	Spanish	Actor	L
Sheldon Andelson	1931–1988	American	Politician	G
Anja Andersen	b. 1969	Danish	Handball player	L
Camilla Andersen	b. 1973	Danish	Handball player	L
Brandon Anderson	b. ?	American	Sociologist, entrepreneur	G
Brett Anderson	b. 1967	English	Rock musician (Suede)	B
Brian Anderson	b. 1976	American	Skateboarder	G
Darla K. Anderson	b. 1968	American	Film producer	L
Eric Anderson	b. 1968	American	Sociologist	G
Gordon Stewart Anderson	1958–1991	Canadian	Writer	G
Jane Anderson	b. 1954	American	Actor, playwright, director	L
Lindsay Anderson	1923–1994	Scottish	Film director	G
Margaret C. Anderson	1886–1973	American	Magazine editor	L
Ruth Anderson	1928–2019	American	Composer	L
Fernando Grostein Andrade	b. 1981	Brazilian	Filmmaker	G
Jéssica Andrade	b. 1991	Brazilian	Mixed martial artist	L
Mário de Andrade	1893–1945	Brazilian	Writer	G
Jack Andraka	b. 1997	American	Inventor, scientist, cancer researcher	G
Marc Andreyko	b. 1970	American	Writer, screenwriter	G
Harry Andrews	1911–1989	English	Actor	G
Robert Andrews	1895–1976	English	Actor	G
Stephen Andrews	b. 1956	Canadian	Artist	G
Leopold Andrian	1875−1951	Austrian	Author, dramatist, diplomat	G
Sergey Androsenko	b. 1988	Belarusian	Activist	G
Bohdan Andrusyshyn (aka Danchyk)	b. 1958	Belarusian	Journalist, singer	G
Jerzy Andrzejewski	1909–1983	Polish	Author	G
Abraham Ángel	1905–1924	Mexican	Painter	G
Ramsey Angela	b. 1999	Dutch	Track and field athlete	G
Michael Angelakos	b. 1987	American	Musician, singer (Passion Pit)	B
Angèle	b. 1995	Belgian	Pop singer	B
Kenneth Anger	1927–2023	American	Filmmaker, author	G
Nadine Angerer	b. 1978	German	Football (soccer) player	B
Dallas Angguish	b. 1968	Australian	Writer	G
Ängie	b. 1995	Swedish	Pop singer	B
Patrick Angus	1953–1992	American	Artist	G
Anitta	b. 1993	Brazilian	Singer, songwriter	B
Alyson Annan	b. 1973	Australian	Field hockey player	L
Nicco Annan	b. ?	American	Actor, dancer, choreographer	G
Anne-Marie	b. 1991	English	Singer-songwriter	B
Ignatius Annor	b. ?	Ghanaian	Journalist	G
Ant	b. 1967	American	Actor, comedian	B
Concordia Antarova	1886–1959	Russian	Opera singer	L
Katharine Anthony	1877–1965	American	Biographer	L
Tafari Anthony	b. ?	Canadian	Singer, songwriter	G
Trey Anthony	b. 1974	Canadian	Comedian, playwright	L
Steve Antin	b. 1956	American	Actor, screenwriter	G
Antinous	110–130 CE	Greek	Beloved of Roman Emperor Hadrian	G
Bethany Antonia	b. 1997	English	Actor	L
Nickie Antonio	b. 1955	American	Politician	L
Laura Antoniou	b. 1963	American	Author	L
Gloria E. Anzaldúa	1942–2004	American	Writer	L
Omar Apollo	b. 1997	American	Musician	G
Luc Appermont	b. 1949	Belgian	TV presenter	G
Kwame Anthony Appiah	b. 1954	Ghanaian	Philosopher, writer	G
Alistair Appleton	b. 1970	English	TV presenter	G
Bettina Aptheker	b. 1944	American	Activist, academic	L
Aleksey Apukhtin	1840–1893	Russian	Poet	G
Virginia Apuzzo	b. 1941	American	Gay rights and HIV/AIDS activist	L
Francisco Aragón	b. ?	American	Poet, editor, writer	G
Louis Aragon	1897–1982	French	Poet, novelist	B
Gregg Araki	b. 1959	American	Filmmaker	G
Enrique Arancibia Clavel	1944–2011	Chilean	Chilean DINA security service agent and assassinator	G
Roberto Arango	b. ?	American	Politician	G
Gérard Araud	b. 1953	French	Diplomat	G
John Aravosis	b. 1963	American	LGBT rights activist	G
Arca	b. 1989	Venezuelan	Electronic record producer, songwriter, mixing engineer, DJ	G
Penny Arcade	b. 1950	American	Performance artist, actor, playwright	B
Francesco Arcangeli	1737–1768	Italian	Cook, criminal	G
Geisa Arcanjo	b. 1991	Brazilian	Shot putter, track and field athlete	L
Rose Arce	b. ?	American	TV journalist	L
Michael Arceneaux	b. 1984	American	Writer	G
Bert Archer	b. 1968	Canadian	Writer	G
David Archuleta	b. 1990	American	Singer-songwriter, actor	G
Alfie Arcuri	b. 1988	Australian	Singer-songwriter	G
Michael Arden	b. 1982	American	Actor, stage director, composer	G
Emile Ardolino	1943–1993	American	Film director, choreographer, producer	G
Reinaldo Arenas	1943–1990	Cuban	Writer	G
Bárbara "Babi" Arenhart	b. 1986	Brazilian	Handball player	L
Camilo Arenivar	b. 1967	American	Musician, minister	G
Pietro Aretino	1492–1556	Italian	Writer, satirist	G
Fin Argus	b. 1998	American	Actor, musician	G
Joey Arias	b. 1949	American	Performance artist, drag performer	G
George Arison	b. 1977	Georgian-American	Businessman, investor, political activist	G
Walter Arlen	1920–2023	Austrian-American	Composer	G
Giorgio Armani	1934–2025	Italian	Fashion designer	B
Joan Armatrading	b. 1950	Kittian-British	Singer-songwriter	L
Jillian Armenante	b. 1968	American	Actor, writer	L
Richard Armitage	b. 1971	English	Actor	G
Billie Joe Armstrong	b. 1972	American	Rock musician (Green Day)	B
Taylor Armstrong	b. 1971	American	TV personality	B
François Arnaud	b. 1985	Canadian	Actor	B
Chip Arndt	b. 1966	American	Reality TV show contestant, LGBT rights activist	G
Judith Arndt	b. 1976	German	Cyclist	L
Kristen Arnett	b. 1980	American	Author, essayist	L
Alice Arnold	b. 1962	English	Broadcaster, journalist	L
Mary Ellicott Arnold	1876–1968	American	Social activist, writer	L
Polly Arnold	b. 1972	American	Chemistry professor	L
Jake Arnott	b. 1961	English	Author	G
Siri Hall Arnøy	b. 1978	Norwegian	Politician	L
Jean-Paul Aron	1925–1988	French	Writer	G
Willem Arondeus	1894–1943	Dutch	Painter, author, WWII Resistance member	G
Manish Arora	b. 1972	Indian	Fashion designer	G
Vardaan Arora	b. 1992	Indian	Singer	G
John S. Arrowood	b. 1956	American	Judge	G
Pat Arrowsmith	b. 1930	English	Writer, peace activist	L
Jennifer Arroyo	b. 1975	American	Musician	L
Rane Arroyo	1954–2010	American	Poet, playwright, and scholar	G
Gavin Arthur	1901–1972	American	Astrologer, sexologist	B
Robert Arthur	1925–2008	American	Actor	G
Newton Arvin	1900–1963	American	Writer, academic	G
Dorothy Arzner	1897–1979	American	Film director	L
Anita Asante	b. 1985	English	Footballer	L
Brian Asawa	1966–2016	American	Opera singer (countertenor)	G
Charles Robert Ashbee	1863–1942	English	Architect, designer	G
John Ashbery	1927–2017	American	Poet	G
Roy Ashburn	b. 1954	American	Politician	G
Henrik Asheim	b. 1983	Norwegian	Politician	G
Oreet Ashery	b. 1966	Israeli-British	Interdisciplinary artist	L
Asiahn	b. 1987	American	Singer-songwriter	L
Charles Ashleigh	1892–1974	English	Labour activist, writer, translator	G
Howard Ashman	1950–1991	American	Lyricist	G
Brooks Ashmanskas	b. 1969	American	Actor	G
Ashnikko	b. 1996	American	Rapper, singer-songwriter	B
Frederick Ashton	1904–1988	British	Choreographer	G
Mark Ashton	1960–1987	English	Gay rights activist, co-founder of Lesbians and Gays Support the Miners	G
Othniel Askew	1972–2003	American	Politician, murderer	G
Raoul Aslan	1886–1958	Austrian	Actor	G
Isa Asp	1853–1872	Finnish	Poet	L
Anthony Asquith	1902–1968	English	Film director	G
Apurva Asrani	b. 1978	Indian	Filmmaker	G
Charles Coypeau d'Assoucy	1605–1677	French	Musician, burlesque poet	G
Rob Astbury	b. 1948	Australian	Journalist, TV presenter	G
Nils Asther	1897–1981	Swedish	Actor	G
Sverker Åström	1915–2012	Swedish	Diplomat	G
Shinjiro Atae	b. 1988	Japanese	Musical artist	G
Karen Atala	b. 1964	Chilean	Lawyer, fighting for custody of her children	L
Kutluğ Ataman	b. 1961	Turkish	Filmmaker	G
David Atherton	b. 1976	English	Baker	G
John Atherton	1598–1640	English	Anglican bishop executed for buggery	G
Jeremy Atherton Lin	b. ?	American	Author, essayist	G
Ron Athey	b. 1961	American	Artist	G
Toni Atkins	b. 1962	American	Politician	L
Kelvin Atkinson	b. 1969	American	Politician; He and Sheridan Howard were the first same-sex couple to marry in Nevada	G
Ti-Grace Atkinson	b. 1938	American	Feminist author	L
Jake Atlas	b. 1994	American	Professional wrestler	G
Sa'ed Atshan	b. 1984	Palestinian	Anthropologist, professor	G
Dean Atta	b. ?	British	Poet	G
Gabriel Attal	b. 1989	French	Prime Minister of France	G
Efva Attling	b. 1952	Swedish	Jewelry designer, singer, model, dancer	L
Amelia Atwater-Rhodes	b. 1984	American	Writer	L
Clare Atwood	1866–1962	English	Painter	L
Alex Au	b. 1952	Singaporean	LGBT rights activist, writer	G
Kevyn Aucoin	1962–2002	American	Make-up artist	G
W. H. Auden	1907–1973	English	Poet	G
Marie-Thérèse Auffray	1912–1990	French	Painter, WWII resistance member	L
François Augiéras	1925–1971	French	Writer	G
Anita Augspurg	1857–1943	German	Jurist, actor, writer, feminist activist	L
John August	b. 1970	American	Screenwriter	G
Ernest Augustus, Duke of York and Albany	1674–1728	German-British	Soldier, Prince-Bishop of Osnabrück	G
Seimone Augustus	b. 1984	American	Basketball player	L
Raveena Aurora	b. 1994	American	Singer-songwriter	B
Michael Ausiello	b. 1972	American	TV journalist	G
Alice Austen	1866–1952	American	Photographer	L
Edward Avedisian	1936–2007	American	Painter	G
Richard Avedon	1923–2004	American	Photographer	B
Irma Avegno	1881–1913	Uruguayan	Businesswoman	L
Joe Average	b. 1957	Canadian	Artist	G
Bronze Avery	b. ?	American	Singer-songwriter	G
Bob Avian	1937–2021	American	Dancer, choreographer	G
Kevin Aviance	b. 1968	American	Entertainer	G
Mother Juan Aviance	b. 1963	American	Dancer, music artist, nightclub host, label owner	G
Erick Martínez Ávila	1980–2012	Honduran	LGBT advocate, spokesperson	G
Arthur Aviles	b. 1963	American	Dancer, choreographer	G
Andrey Avinoff	1884–1949	Russian	Entomologist, lepidopterist, botanist, artist, art critic	G
Yossi Avni-Levy	b. 1962	Israeli	Writer, diplomat	G
Axel and Eigil Axgil	1915–2011; 1922–1995	Danish	First gay couple in the world joined in a civil union	G
Kévin Aymoz	b. 1997	French	Figure skater	G
Tony Ayres	b. 1961	Australian	Film director, screenwriter	G
Omar Ayuso	b. 1998	Spanish	Actor	G
Assi Azar	b. 1979	Israeli	TV personality	G
Predrag Azdejković	b. 1978	Serbian	Film producer, journalist, LGBT rights activist	G
Mobeen Azhar	b. 1980?	British	Journalist	G
Prince Abdul Azim of Brunei	1982–2020	Bruneian	Film producer	G
Azis	b. 1978	Romani-Bulgarian	Chalga singer	G
Georges Azzi	b. 1979	Lebanese	Co-founder of Helem, a Lebanese non-profit organization for LGBT people	G
Jennifer Azzi	b. 1968	American	Basketball player	L

== See also ==
- List of gay, lesbian or bisexual people
