= Conduit (journal) =

Literary magazine

Conduit is a biannual literary journal, published in Saint Paul, Minnesota. It was founded by editor-in-chief William Waltz in 1993. Each issue contains original poetry and interviews conducted by Conduit staff. Since 2018, Conduit has also operated a book publishing division, Conduit Books & Ephemera, which awards two annual book prizes: The Marystina Santiestevan First Book Prize and the Minds On Fire Open Book Prize.

== History ==
Conduit was founded in 1993 by editor-in-chief William Waltz, shortly after he completed graduate school. According to Waltz, he admired the journals Exquisite Corpse and Poetry East but could find few venues to submit his work and decided to found his own.

Conduit is headquartered in Saint Paul, Minnesota.

== Contents ==
Each issue contains original poetry and interviews conducted by Conduit staff. Past interviews have included discussions with astronomers, ethno-botanists, artists, and historians. Associate editor Steven Lee Beeber's interview with Buzz Aldrin was reprinted in Harper's Magazine.

Issues are themed, though Waltz says that poetry is selected without reference to the theme; instead, the artwork and interviews "do the heavy work of stamping the theme to the issue".

Conduit has published the work of Rick Alley, Lee Upton, Jenny Boully, Bob Hicok, George Kalamaras, Noelle Kocot, Tomaž Šalamun, Mary Jo Bang, Michael Teig, Dean Young, Albert Goldbarth, María Negroni, Oksana Maksymchuk, James Tate, and John Ashbery.

In format, issues of Conduit are tall and narrow, and paginated with words instead of numbers.

== Book publishing press ==
In 2018, Conduit launched a book publishing subdivision, Conduit Books & Ephemera. Books published by Conduit Books & Ephemera include winners of Conduit’s Marystina Santiestevan First Book Prize and the Minds On Fire Open Book Prize, as well as works by other notable poets such as Dara Barrois/Dixon.

=== Book prizes ===
With the launch of Conduit’s book publishing subdivision, Conduit Books & Ephemera, they also launched two annual book prizes: The Marystina Santiestevan First Book Prize and the Minds On Fire Open Book Prize. The Marystina Santiestevan First Book Prize is awarded annually to a poet writing in English who has not yet published a full-length poetry book. The Minds On Fire Open Book Prize is awarded annually and open to any poet writing in English, regardless of previous publication record, the prize seeks to represent the best contemporary writing in high quality editions of enduring value.

=== Minds On Fire Open Book Prize Winners ===
- 2025: Where Is Everyone! By Elizabeth Zuba
- 2024: Bright Life, Animal Heart by Laura Minor
- 2023: Autoblivion by Trey Moody
- 2022: Thunderbird Inn by Collin Callahan
- 2021: The World to Come by David Keplinger
- 2020: Sacrificial Metal by Esther Lee
- 2019: The Last Note Becomes Its Listener by Jeffrey Morgan

=== Marystina Santiestevan First Book Prize Winners ===
- 2025: Ghost In the Archive by Jennifer Loyd
- 2024: Beneath All Water by Zackary Medlin
- 2023: The Art of Bagging by Joshua Gottlieb-Miller
- 2022: The Birthday Of the Dead by Rachel Abramowitz
- 2021: Present Tense Complex by Suphil Lee Park
- 2020: The Miraculous, Sometimes by Meg Shevenock
- 2019: Animul/Flame by Michelle Lewis

== Other activities ==
Conduit also hosts a quarterly poetry reading called Minds On Fire Live, which showcases the work of poets that have previously been published by Conduit.
