= Vincent Desmond =

Nigerian sexual and human right activist

- Born: 27 September 1999 (age 26)
- Occupations: Writer; LGBTQ activist
- Years active: 2017–present
- Website: www.desmondvincent.me

Vincent Desmond (born 27 September 1999) is a Lagos-based Nigerian writer and Nigerian LGBTQ advocate. He is also the chief-editor and publisher of A Nasty Boy fashion magazine, founded by Richard Akuson, a Nigerian journalist and lawyer in February 2017.

Desmond has written for print and online magazines. He was previously a writer at BellaNaija and an editor at Zikoko, a youth culture publication in Nigeria.

== Personal life ==
Desmond is openly queer.

In 2020, he shared his view on childbirth and parenting on his micro blogging site:

"My beef with having kids is that I think having kids is an inherently very selfish thing. Selfish on the part of the parents because you're bringing in a whole human and forcing them to live and participate in life and society. And for what? Bragging rights? Because you feel it's time."

== Recognition ==
In 2020, he was awarded the Young Trailblazer of the Year by TIERS Nigeria.

In 2021, he was listed among "The 150 Most Interesting Nigerians in Culture in 2019" by RED Media Africa, and was nominated for The Future Awards Africa Prize For Leading Conversation.
