= William Alley (disambiguation) =

William Alley (1510–1570) was an Anglican bishop and author.

William Alley may also refer to:

- William Alley (javelin thrower) (born 1936), American javelin thrower
- William Nassau Alley (1808–1849), Irish Methodist
- Bill Alley (1919–2004), Australian cricketer
