= A Nasty Boy =

LGBTQ magazine in Nigeria

A Nasty Boy is a Nigerian fashion magazine founded on February 19, 2017. It is Nigeria's first LGBTQ magazine. The publication chronicles and celebrates underground stories, people, and voices through the lens of Nigeria's marginalized LGBTQ community. A Nasty Boy was founded by Richard Akuson, a Nigerian lawyer, fashion journalist, writer, editor, and PR executive. In June 2017, A Nasty Boy was featured in a CNN article. that launched it to the international spotlight. Soon afterward, Dazed declared the publication as Nigeria's most controversial fashion magazine, and Vogue editors listed A Nasty Boy on their What to Read this Fall as selected by Vogue editors. The magazine has since enjoyed fawning profiles on The Guardian, BBC, France24's The Observers, 1843 Magazine, i-D, OkayAfrica, Mic, amongst many others.

== Projects ==
Championing Diversity

For LGBT pride 2017, A Nasty Boy collaborated with WeTransfer and, creative network, The Dots to showcase the next generation of LGBTQ creative talent making waves around the world.

Nasty 40 List

In 2018, for A Nasty Boy's inaugural list, the magazine highlighted 40 creatives who are disrupting the norm through art, photography, writing and more. The list featured artists such as Ruth Ossai, Adebayo Oke Lawal, Papa Oppong, Yagazie Emezi, and Rich Mnisi.

New Leadership

In January 2020, founder Richard Akuson announced that Vincent Desmond would take over as the new editor and publisher of the magazine.
