= Still City: Diary of an Invasion =

2024 poetry collection by Oksana Maksymchuk

- Author: Oksana Maksymchuk
- Language: English
- Genre: Poetry
- Published: 30 May 2024 (Carcanet); November 2024 (University of Pittsburgh Press)
- Publisher: Carcanet Press (United Kingdom); University of Pittsburgh Press (United States)
- Pages: 128 (Carcanet); 136 (University of Pittsburgh Press)
- ISBN: 978-1-80017-402-3

Still City: Diary of an Invasion is a poetry collection by Ukrainian-American poet and translator Oksana Maksymchuk. The book was published in the United Kingdom by Carcanet Press in May 2024, and in the United States by the University of Pittsburgh Press in November 2024. The poems cover experiences in the months leading up to the 2022 Russian invasion of Ukraine, and during the war itself.

== Reception ==
In a review for the Cleveland Review of Books, Michelles Chan Schmidt discusses Still City as a work shaped by the experience of war and examines the collection's language and form.

In The Guardian review roundup, Philip Terry called it a "poetic diary" of the invasion and noted how it "captures the uncertainty with which people living in a modern European economy prepare themselves for conflict".

In an interview with Poetry Northwest, Maksymchuk discussed writing the book in English and her experiences writing poetry during the war.

== Awards ==
The book was longlisted for the 2025 Griffin Poetry Prize and the 2025 PEN/Voelcker Award for Poetry.
