= Kim Alley =

American modeling agent

- Born: Kimberly Ann Alley; April 11, 1965 (age 59); Richmond, Virginia
- Occupation: Model scout
- Years active: 1982-present
- Modeling information
- Height: 1.75 m (5 ft 9 in)
- Hair color: Brown
- Eye color: Green
- Website: kimalleymodels.com

Kimberly Ann Alley (born April 11, 1965) is a modeling agent who operates a modeling agency in Richmond, Virginia. She worked as an international model for thirteen years, being signed with Ford Models, Wilhelmina Models, and Elite Model Management. She landed campaigns for Lancôme, Evian, and Benetton, and was featured in popular fashion magazines, including French Vogue, Italian Vogue, Elle, and Italian Bazaar. In the United States, she served as an agent for several agencies in New York City, managing the careers of celebrities, stylists, and photographers.

== Early life ==
Kimberly Ann Alley was born on April 11, 1965, in Richmond, Virginia. Raised in the West End, she attended Monacan High School in Chesterfield County, Virginia, where she studied fashion merchandising for four years. As a skilled tennis player from an early age, she was offered a tennis scholarship to the United States Military Academy at West Point, although she decided to pursue a modeling career instead. She graduated from Monacan High School in 1983.

== Career ==
Alley began modeling locally in 1980, although she was not scouted until two years later, when Ford Modeling Agency discovered her. She traveled to New York City to stay with Eileen Ford, co-founder of the agency she was signed with, who helped her compile her portfolio. Alley traveled abroad for most of her career as a Ford model. She first journeyed to Spain in 1983. In Osaka, Japan, she stylized herself as "Kimmy," although she adopted the moniker "Alley Cat" in the United States. Her career in America took her across the country, to cities such as Chicago, Los Angeles, and Miami, while she was working as a model for Elite Model Management and Wilhelmina Models. Along the way, she became acquainted with many celebrities, including Jack Nicholson, Joe Pesci, Robert De Niro, Naomi Campbell, and Nicole Ritchie.

An increase in her publicity occurred in 1991, when she briefly became romantically involved with Donald Trump. She met him at the penthouse of Jerry Brandt, the owner of The Ritz, and was driven in his limousine to various clubs before being dropped off at her apartment on Park Avenue. In the wake of this event, much controversy arose, as Trump had previously been engaged to actress Marla Maples. Alley appeared on Geraldo, the television show hosted by Geraldo Rivera, on October 1, 1991, but rejected offers to appear on other talk shows such as Late Night with David Letterman. The event continued to make headlines until Trump stated he did not have interest in her.

In 1996, Alley's career shifted away from modeling when Paris USA Models requested that she work as an agent in New York. For the next ten years she was employed by noteworthy agencies including Bryan Bantry Agency, APM Models, and Elite Model Management. It was around this time that she discovered Amy Lemons, who was later placed with IMG Models. She founded Alley Management, now known as Kim Alley Models, in 2005, becoming a model scout with the objective of placing aspiring models with top agencies. She has developed connections with over fifty American modeling agencies.

== Virginia's Top Model ==
In 2009, Alley produced Virginia's Top Model, a Richmond, Virginia competition closely resembling America's Next Top Model. The purpose of Virginia's Top Model was to spotlight one deserving contestant and take his or her career to the next level and meet face to face with modeling agents in New York City. Judges pared more than 100 hopefuls down to four women and one man. The contestants were all new to the modeling world. The winner would travel with Alley to New York City to meet with top agencies, including Elite Model Management, IMG Model Agency and the Ford Modeling Agency.
