= Ignatius Annor =

Ghanaian journalist

- Born: Ghana
- Education: Jayee University College; Swansea University
- Occupation: Multimedia journalist
- Employer: Voice Of America News

Ignatius Annor is a Ghanaian journalist who works for the VOA News English to Africa Service. Ignatius has previously worked for Metro TV (Ghana) in Accra and then African News, a Pan African channel based in Pointe-Noire in Republic of the Congo. Ignatius came out as gay live on the Joy news channel evening program PM Express in Ghana on February 22, 2021.

== Early life and education ==
He started his journalism career with Metro TV (Ghana) before leaving to do his master's in international journalism at the Swansea University.

Ignatius Currently works as a multimedia journalist for the VOA News English to Africa Service.
