= Oksana Maksymchuk =

Poet, translator and scholar

- Оксана Максимчук
- Born: April 4, 1982 (age 44); Lviv, Ukraine
- Education: University Laboratory High School (Urbana, Illinois); Bryn Mawr College; Northwestern University
- Writing career
- Genre: Poetry

Oksana Maksymchuk (Note: Ukrainian: Оксана Максимчук, romanized: Oksana Maksymchuk) (born April 4, 1982) is a Ukrainian American poet, translator, and scholar, and an author of three full-length volumes of poetry in Ukrainian and English languages. She is best known for her award-winning translations and for her debut English-language poetry collection Still City: Diary of an Invasion.

== Early life and education ==
Oksana Maksymchuk was born in Lviv, Ukraine. Her father was the theater actor Svyatoslav Maksymchuk (Ukrainian: Святослав Максимчук), named People's Artist of Ukraine (2000), a child survivor of the massacre of the village of Remel. Her mother was a medical doctor. In 1997 she moved with her mother to Urbana, Illinois, where she attended University Laboratory High School.

She earned her BA from Bryn Mawr College in 2004. At Bryn Mawr, she majored in Peace and Conflict Studies and defended an honors thesis on the interpretative practices adopted by Truth and Reconciliation Commissions in South Africa and elsewhere. She also majored in philosophy at Haverford College (part of the Tri-College Consortium), and defended an honors thesis on the problems of freedom, authenticity, and technology in the works of Martin Heidegger and G.W.F. Hegel. With the support from Bryn Mawr's Center for Ethnicities, Communities, and Social Policy, she held a summer internship at the Registry of Survivors of the United States Holocaust Memorial Museum. As a senior, she was awarded a Dorothy Nepper Marshall Fellowship as one of the top three students in the social sciences at the college, enabling her to pursue a research project and to serve as a teaching assistant for courses on war and violent conflict.

She earned her PhD in philosophy from Northwestern University. Her dissertation was directed by Richard Kraut and was titled "The Measure Doctrine in Plato's Protagoras". Her graduate coursework included seminars and workshops with Ernesto Laclau, Jürgen Habermas, Charles Taylor, Cristina Lafont, Rachel Zuckert, Peter Ludlow, Dermot Moran, Sanford Goldberg, and Penelope Deutscher. As a graduate student, she attended the monthly workshops of the Chicago Consortium for Ancient Philosophy, which included Martha Nussbaum, Agnès Callard, Jonathan Lear, and others. She was part of the Classics Interdisciplinary Cluster and a participant in the weekly translation workshops focusing on the works of Plato and Aristotle.

== Poetry collections ==
- Still City. University of Pittsburgh Press in the USA and Carcanet Press in the UK, 2024.
- Лови (Lovy). Kyiv: Smoloskyp Press, 2008. In Ukrainian.
- Ксенії (Xenia). Lviv: Pyramid Publishers, 2005. In Ukrainian.

== In translation ==
- Tagebuch einer Invasion. Translated into German by Mattias Kniep. With an afterword by Ilya Kaminsky. Munich: Lyrik Kabinett bei Hanser, 2025.

== Translations ==
- Alex Averbuch, Furious Harvests. Translated with Max Rosochinsky. Cambridge, MA: HURI/Harvard University Press, 2026.
- Marianna Kiyanovska, The Voices of Babyn Yar. Translated with Max Rosochinsky. Cambridge, MA: HURI/Harvard University Press, 2022.
- Lyuba Yakimchuk, Apricots of Donbas. Translated with Max Rosochinsky and Svetlana Lavochkina. Sandpoint: Lost Horse Press, 2021.

== Anthology ==
- Words for War: New Poems from Ukraine. Selected, compiled, and edited with Max Rosochinsky. Introduction by Ilya Kaminsky. Afterword by Polina Barskova. Boston: HURI/Academic Studies Press, 2017.

== Non-fiction ==
Maksymchuk published research articles on ancient relativism, civic virtue, and moral education in Archiv für Geschichte der Philosophie and the British Journal for the History of Philosophy. Her papers on the role of leisure and amusement in human flourishing and on the limitations of futurist poetry appeared in edited volumes.

== Awards ==
Maksymchuk was a visiting writer or a writer in residence at Baruch College, University of Chicago, Institute for Advanced Study at the Central European University, University of Arkansas in Fayetteville, Cheuse Center for International Writers, and Villa Waldberta in Munich. She won first place in the Richmond Lattimore and Joseph Brodsky-Stephen Spender translation competitions.

Her co-translation of Marianna Kiyanovska's collection The Voices of Babyn Yar was supported by a National Endowment for the Arts Translation Fellowship. It won the Scaglione Prize for Literary Translation from the Modern Language Association of America, Peterson Translated Book Award, and American Association for Ukrainian Studies Translation Prize.

As a Ukrainian-language poet, she is a recipient of Ihor-Bohdan Antonych(uk) and Smoloskyp(uk) prizes.

Her collection Still City was longlisted for the 2025 Griffin Poetry Prize and the 2025 PEN/Voelcker Award for Poetry.

== Personal life ==
She lives between her hometown of Lviv in Ukraine and several cities in the U.S. and Europe.
