= George Alley =

Irish Methodist minister

George Alley (died 1912) was an Irish Methodist.

Alley was a younger brother of William Nassau Alley. He became a minister in 1852, and upon his death, it was said that "Seldom has the Church been favoured with a man so complete in character and adaptation for our work." His son, James Murdock Alley, was also a Methodist minister.
