= Dallas John Baker =

Australian writer and academic

- Born: 1968 (age 57–58); Toowoomba, Queensland, Australia
- Occupation: Author
- Writing career
- Genres: Memoir, Travel Writing, Scriptwriting
- Website: dallasangguish.com

Dallas John Baker (born Dallas John Angguish Baker on 19 February 1968) is an Australian writer and academic noted for poetry, short stories and travel writing whose work deals with themes of alienation, otherness and sexuality. He is also known as Dallas Angguish, the name he used as a performance poet beginning in the 1980s. He has been repeatedly compared to Truman Capote and to David Sedaris. Angguish, who is openly gay, has also written plays and screenplays some of which have been produced. He is known for a lyrical style that foregrounds feeling and the use of powerful descriptive passages. Due to his evocative short stories, he has been variously described as Truman Capote's literary heir and as reminiscent of Carson McCullers, the much lauded Southern Gothic writer. His prose poetry has appeared in the journals Text, Lodestar Quarterly, Retort Magazine and Polari journal. His short stories have appeared in the book anthologies "Dumped", "Bend, Don't Shatter","Sensual Travels" and others. His collection of memoir and travel writing "Anywhere But Here", released in February 2006, received very strong reviews. In particular Graeme Aitken of Australian gay magazine DNA wrote:

Dallas John Baker "was born in Toowoomba, Queensland and this collection of stories is a mix of travel tales, memoir and fiction. The first section of the book, set in America’s Deep South, confirm [his] talent. The stories are highly atmospheric, off-beat and absorbing. Some have gay content, but not all of them. Local readers will be interested in the final section of stories, set in Australia with locales ranging from Byron Bay to the Darling Downs. It’s refreshing to read new gay-themed Australian work that isn’t set in Melbourne or Sydney." The review also noted that Dallas John Baker "demonstrates an enviable flair for storytelling."

Baker published a second book of travel writing in 2011 titled 'America Divine: Travels in the Hidden South'. This book focuses on travel in the South of the US, particularly New Orleans. The book explores folk religion practices of the South including voodoo, Southern Hoodoo and snake-handling among other things. America Divine has been described as 'what you'd get if Victor Frankenstein made a new monster by splicing together body parts of David Sedaris, Truman Capote, Bruce Chatwin and just a bit of Djuna Barnes'. Another reviewer wrote that Angguish is 'an impressively skilled writer' and 'something of a strange genius'. The same reviewer later hailed Angguish as Truman Capote's literary heir.

== Poetic style ==
In the eighties and nineties, under the nom de plume Dallas Angguish, Baker performed at many spoken word events in Australia garnering a reputation as one of Australia's most enigmatic, queer spoken word performers. A recording of his spoken word piece "The Pugilist", set to music by composer Luke Monsour, was played on Australia's national youth radio broadcaster Triple J. Baker's poetry is in the tradition of queer poetics initiated by Walt Whitman and consolidated by Allen Ginsberg, a tradition that foregrounds the colloquial voice, a first person, personal point of view and the expression of an erotic and mystical vision.

Baker's poetry is often highly evocative and self-reflexive, as in the passage below:

I am part libertine, part priest. I have dual yearnings. On the one hand I like solitude and introspection. I am a sky-gazer whose goals are universal. I crave the freedom of simplicity. On the other hand I am drawn to the communion of skin. I yearn to abandon myself, and thereby become free, in physical delight. These two impulses have often been at odds with each other. I struggle to find a balance.

Much of Dallas John Baker's poetry, written primarily to be spoken, deals with themes of eroticism, alienation and mysticism. The excerpt below, from his poem 'Embrace', is a good example:

As I walk away from your embrace I feel the cold shadow of your pupils falling on the small of my back where I have that tattoo which is an emblem against you and you fire those daggers from your eyes which embed themselves like anchors under the skin of my shoulder-blades and hook me to you with long tethers that are desire not wanting to let go, that are thin streams of poison, and when, in the night as I try to arm myself against you by whispering the long and perfect names of all of my Buddhist saints, you slip your arm under my head like a pillow and your breath comes in close to me like a breeze which has on it all the saltiness of sex and the sea...

This passage illustrates Baker's use of the Beat Generation inspired flowing stream-of-consciousness style he deployed in a series of poems that fuse the paradigms of eroticism and (Tantric Buddhist) mysticism. Baker spent five years as a Buddhist monk and is still committed to Buddhist practice. Another example from his poem 'The Tempo of Shamans' makes the fusion of these twin concerns in Angguish's work explicit:

Your rap pounds on my heart like on an animal skin drum with the deep rhythm of thunder over oceans, that are the bass clarinets of our most holy thoughts, and each consonant that leaps from your tongue is a missile of enticement that heat-seeks-out my longing for you and inflames it and as your syntax evolves into ideas I feel drunk and need to close my eyes and invoke you with my mind's eye and in that picture your rap is a ballad that has tones like wet silk and you are a fierce troubador, who holds a hard hand over my mouth to keep me quiet and listening, who chants with incessant power, words that are waves of erotic assault that bring me close to that precipice that is petit morte that is silence and the dark void, that is a window into the true nature of things, and as the blitzkrieg of your thumping voice hits me square in the chest I feel explosions of ecstasy that shake my place in space and time and whir the electrons of my being into a whizz fizz sort of a thing that is just like being a mushroom cloud of mass destruction

== Scholarly writing ==
Dallas John Baker is also a scholar in the disciplines of editing & publishing, Creative Writing, Queer Theory and Buddhism. He has recently published papers in the scholarly journals Colloquy: Text, Theory, Critique, Creative Industries Journal, Text and Postscripts. These works are published under the name Dallas J. Baker.

== Published works ==
- I Go Far Away Sometimes (ISBN 978-0994242501), published in 2014
- America Divine: Travels in the Hidden South (ISBN 9781466371408), published in 2011
- Anywhere But Here (ISBN 9781411674455), published in 2006
- Irezumi (ASIN: B007TQEPKY), published in 2011
- Cherry Blossom Bicycle Crazy (ASIN B007ZK7O5M), published in 2011
