= María Negroni =

Argentinian poet, essayist, novelist, and translator

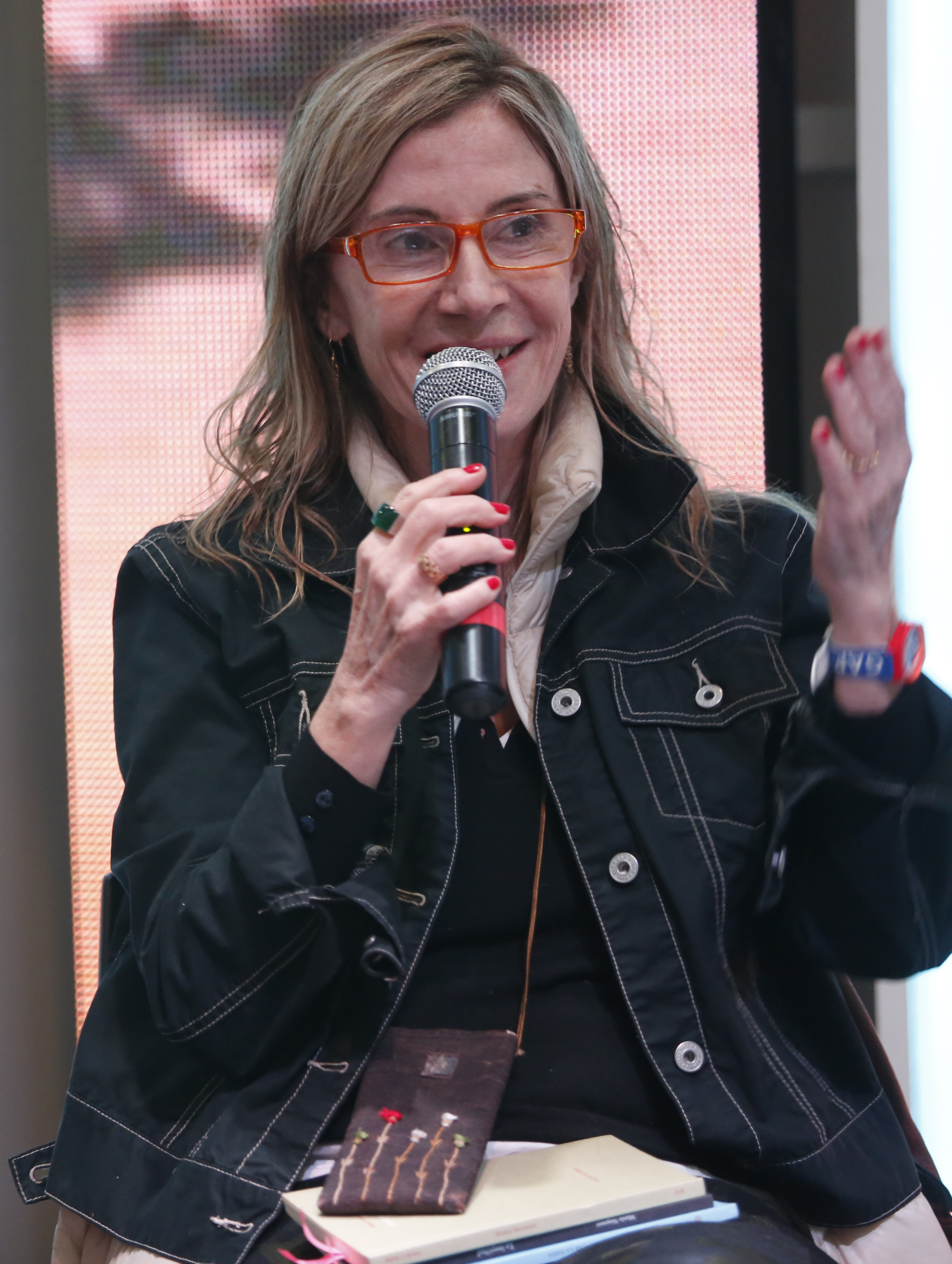
María Negroni in 2015

María Negroni (born 1951 in Rosario, Argentina) is an Argentinian poet, essayist, novelist and translator.

She graduated from Columbia University, with a PhD in Latin American Literature. She teaches at Sarah Lawrence College. She was a visiting professor at New York University, in 2008.

== Awards ==
- International Prize for Essay Writing from Siglo XXI
- 2002 PEN Award for best book of poetry in translation, for Islandia
- 2000-2001 Octavio Paz Fellowship for Poetry
- 1997 Argentine National Book Award, for El viaje de la noche
- 1994 Guggenheim Fellowships

== Works ==
- De tanto desolar Libros de Tierra Firme, 1985
- La jaula bajo el trapo, (1991); Editorial Cuarto Propio, 1999, ISBN 978-956-260-151-1
- El viaje de la noche Lumen, 1994, ISBN 978-84-264-2781-6
  - Night Journey, Translator Anne Twitty, Princeton University Press, 2002, ISBN 978-0-691-09098-6
- Diario Extranjero Pequena Venecia, 2000, ISBN 978-980-6315-79-2
- La ineptitud Alción Editora, 2002
- Islandia (1994)
  - Islandia: a poem, Translator Anne Twitty, Station Hill / Barrytown, Ltd., 2001, ISBN 978-1-886449-15-2

=== Essays ===
- Ciudad gótica Bajo la Luna Nueva, 1994, ISBN 978-987-99302-8-1; Bajo la Luna, 2007, ISBN 978-987-9108-35-2
- El testigo lúcido: la obra de sombra de Alejandra Pizarnik, Beatriz Viterbo Editora, 2003, ISBN 978-950-845-138-5
- Museo negro, Grupo Editorial Norma, 1999, ISBN 978-987-9334-11-9
- Galería fantástica, Siglo XXI, 2009, ISBN 978-607-03-0077-6

=== Novels ===
- El sueño de Ursula Seix Barral, 1998, ISBN 978-950-731-195-6
- La anunciación Emecé Editores / Seix Barral, 2007, ISBN 978-950-731-541-1
