= Henry Alley =

American author and educator

Henry Melton Alley
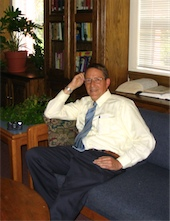
- Born: 1945 (age 80–81)
- Education: Stanford University; Cornell University (MFA, PhD)
- Occupations: Author; educator
- Spouse: Austin Gray

Henry Melton Alley (born 1945) is an American author and educator known for gay themes in his work.

== Life and career ==
Henry Melton Alley grew up in Seattle, Washington, and studied at Stanford University from 1963 to 1967, with a major in English literature and a minor in classics. He wrote his honors thesis on characterization in Milton. After graduating, he attended Cornell University from 1967 to 1971, receiving his MFA in fiction writing and his PhD in prose fiction. After a year of working at Tompkins County Hospital (1972), he went on to teach as a professor at the School of the Ozarks (1972–75), the University of Idaho (1975–82), and in the Robert D. Clark Honors College (1982–2016) of the University of Oregon, where he is currently an emeritus Professor of Literature.

He has six novels: Through Glass (1979), The Lattice (1986), Umbrella of Glass (1988), Precincts of Light (2010), Men Touching (2019) and At Large (2025). Chelsea Station Editions published his short story collection, The Dahlia Field (2017). He is also author of the scholarly study, The Quest for Anonymity: The Novels of George Eliot, published by University of Delaware Press. His stories have appeared over the past forty years in such journals as Seattle Review, Cimarron Review, Clackamas Literary Review, The Virginia Quarterly Review, and Harrington Gay Men's Quarterly Fiction. Since 1978, his literary articles have been published in The Journal of Narrative Technique, Studies in the Novel, Twentieth Century Literature, The Kenyon Review, Papers on Language and Literature and others.

After coming out in 1985, he slowly brought more and more gay themes into his work, which may be described as literary fiction and which emphasizes character and landscape. He is especially interested in people who are just getting on their feet, as well as the way a particular point of view may impinge on the outside world and alter its perceived textures. His separately published story, Leonardo and I, which won the 2006 Gertrude Press Fiction Chapbook Competition, bears both of these interests out, showing a young man breaking free of Freudian psychoanalysis in 1962 and affirming his true gay heritage found in the Renaissance artist Leonardo da Vinci. His political novel, Precincts of Light, dramatizes, in a story of five voices, a brother and sister, both newly out, recovering the lost affections of their children during Oregon's anti-gay Measure Nine crisis. The novel also celebrates Gay/Lesbian Liberation in richly poetic language. His ensuing short story collection, The Dahlia Field, shows a variety of men coming to terms with their need to connect with one another. His new story, "Henry/Henrik," is a piece of historical fiction based on the love relation between the aging Henry James and the young sculptor Henrik Andersen. His ensuing Men Touching, another novel, is a study of a gay Vietnam vet who, in 1986, goes into recovery and forms a greater intimacy with his partner, Bart. It also involves a variety of points of view and has its moments of high lyricism. His next novel, Galen's Legacy, was published by Rattling Good Yarns Press, which offers a webpage with readings from the book. (See below under "References.") It is a close-up on a gay man, newly released from prison for a crime he did not commit, who is guided by the spirit of his beloved and departed gay uncle. In this book, the protagonist finds intimacy with a partner, and their union is blessed by the "presence" of the god Pluto when they take a trip with Galen's family to Holland.

Alley's latest novel, At Large, is in two parts, one involving 1968 from the point of view of activist and poet, Sue Doerrer, the other involving 2001 and beyond from the point of view of Dan Tatascore, an eventual psychiatrist practitioner who also pursues activism. Both protagonists, having worked in the same county hospital, try to better the country. The novel is punctuated by lyrical flights of "at large" characters, who are the miscast and exiled in America. Alley worked on the novel for over fifty years.

Alley lives in Eugene, Oregon, with his husband Austin Gray, a poet and teacher.

== Books ==
- Through Glass (novel, Iris Press, 1979)
- The Lattice (novel, Ariadne Press, 1986)
- Umbrella of Glass (novel, Breitenbush Books, 1988)
- The Quest for Anonymity: The Novels of George Eliot (literary criticism, University of Delaware Press, 1997)
- Precincts of Light (novel, Inkwater Press, 2010)
- The Dahlia Field (short story collection, Chelsea Station Editions, 2017)
- Men Touching (novel, Chelsea Station Editions, 2019).
- Galen's Legacy (novel, Rattling Good Yarns, 2022).
- At Large (novel, Luminare Press, 2025).

== Chapbooks ==
- The York Handbook for the Teaching of College Creative Writing (teacher's guide, York Press, 1979)
- Haemon (verse drama, Gusto Press, 1980)
- Leonardo and I (story, Gertrude Press, 2006)

== Stories and novel segments ==
- "The Festival." University Review, 36, No. 1(1969), 75–80.
- "Through Glass" (novel segment). Webster Review, 1, No. 3 (1975), 42–62.
- "Getting Rid of Aristotle." The New Infinity Review, 2, No. 8 (1975–76), 159–162.
- "Tales." Cimarron Review, 35 (1976), 57–63.
- "Stains of Light" (novel segment). River Bottom Magazine, 4, No. 1 (1977), 18–40.
- "Within the Dial." The Slackwater Review, 2, No. 1, (1977), 77–83.
- "The Museum." The Lake Superior Review, 8, No. 1, (1977), 43–45.
- "The True and Only History of the Alexandria." Sawtooth, No. 4 (1978), 4–16.
- "The Fish." Snapdragon, 1, No. 2 (1978), 7–11.
- "Elizabeth Tyson, Poet, Playwright" (novel segment). The Virginia Woolf Quarterly, 3, Nos. 3–4 (1978), 317–326.
- "The Baritone and the Tenor." The Pikestaff Forum, 1, No. 2, (1979), 22–23.
- "Daughter of Elysium." The Slackwater Review, 4, No. 1, (1981), 104–117.
- "The Eviction." Outerbridge, Nos. 6–7 (1981), 72–78.
- "The Temple." The Pale Fire Review, 2, No. 3 (1982), 34–43.
- "The Wild Bird Bell." Outerbridge, Nos. 12–13 (1984), 84–94.
- "The Two Cultures." The Widener Review, No. 2 (1985), 68–85.
- "The Witness." The Round Table, 2, No. 2 (1985), 30–38.
- "The Commuter." Kansas Quarterly, 17, No. 4 (1985), 131–146.
- "The Watermark." Outerbridge, 16–17 (1986), 36–56.
- "The Lattice" (novel segment). KSOR Guide to the Arts (1987), 40–43.
- "The Periphery." Parting Gifts, 4 (1991), 17–20.
- "Remix." Outerbridge, 22 (1991), 28–43.
- "In the Middle of Things." Parting Gifts, 6 (1993), 39–41.
- "The Birds of Honolulu." Outerbridge, 24 (1993), 97–104.
- "Queen Isabella Pledges Her Jewels." Oxford Magazine, 10 (1995), 94–103.
- "The Audubon Marathon." Seattle Review, 18 (1995–96), 103–111.
- "Earth Day." Outerbridge, 27 (1998), 158–165.
- "Street Kid." Nightfire 1, No. 1 (2001), 48–52.
- "The Wild Bird Bell." Outerbridge: 1975–2000, A Retrospective Anthology, 28 (2001), 14–24.
- "Aunt Lil on Broadway." Gertrude (2001), 5–12.
- "Afternoons with Klaatu." Clackamas Literary Review, 6, No. 1 (2002), 18–27.
- "The Facts of Life." The Virginia Quarterly Review, 78, No. 3 (2002), 481–89.
- "The Sojourners." Clackamas Literary Review, 7, No. 1 (2003), 128–141.
- "The Summer of the Beautiful Pink Hydrangea." Harrington Gay Men's Fiction Quarterly, 5, No. 4 (2003), 37–52.
- "The Dahlia Field." Torquere, Vol. 6 (2004),168–176.
- "Would You Mind Holding Down My Body?" Stone Table Review, 1, No. 1 (2006).
- "The Rembrandt Brotherhood," Harrington Gay Men's Literary Quarterly,8, No. 1 (2006), 35–51.
- "Lucy in the Sky." In Herstory. Ed. Elizabeth Benson-Udom. Danville, CA: elizaPress Publications, 2007. 23–36.
- "Carter's Aida." In HIMS. Ed. Elizabeth Benson-Udom. Danville, CA: elizaPress Publications, 2007. 78–99.
- "In Recovery." Ars Medica, 4, No. 1 (2007), 87–93.
- "Item 'i.'" Colere, 8 (2008), 16–24.
- "Tame." Gertrude, 14 (2010), 67–73.
- "The Alternative." QReview (December 2010).
- "Flesh for Fantasy." QReview (March 2011).
- "The Water Ghost." St. Sebastian Review, 1, No. 2 (2011), 17–19.
- "Dating Igor." In Off the Rocks: An Anthology of GLBT Writing. Ed. Allison Fradkin. Chicago: New Town Writers of Chicago, 2011. 103–116.
- "The Holy Family." St. Sebastian Review, 2, No. 2 (2012), 18–21.
- "The Burning House." Cobalt, 5 (2012).
- "Ashland." Bay Laurel Journal, 1, No. 2 (2012).
- "The World Was All Before Us." Cedilla, 6 (2012), 35–38.
- "Tide." QReview (September 2012).
- "My Nick." Cobalt Review, Special Issue (2013).
- "Ledge Psychology." Off the Rocks 17: An Anthology of GLBT Writing. Ed. Allison Fradkin. Chicago: New Town Writers' Press, 2013. 81–94
- "The Creature from the Black Lagoon Contract." Wilde Magazine,5 (2014), 21–27.
- "To Come Home To." Chelsea Station (2014).
- "The Back of My Mind." Cobalt Review (2014).
- "Children of Mars." Chelsea Station (2014).
- "Cathedral Ruins." Stone Table Review, 2., No. 1 (2015).
- "Yard Sale." Gertrude, 22 (2015), 32–37.
- "Border Guards." Chelsea Station (2016).
- "Visits." ImageOutWrite, 5 (2016), 187–195.
- "Christmas at the Cayuga Diner." Watch My Rising: A Recovery Anthology, Ed. Lynn G. Carlson. Fort Collins: Tulip Tree Publishing, 2016. 22–29.
- "Tea in Coburg." Chelsea Station (2016).
- "Birth." Reservoir (2017).
- "Border Guards." Best of Gay Stories, 2017. Ed. Joe Okonkwo. Maple Shade, New Jersey: Lethe Press, 2017.
- "Henry/Hendrik," Gents: Steamy Stories from the Age of Steam. Ed. Matthew Bright. Amherst, MA: Lethe Press, 2017. 183–191.
- "The Policeman's Son." ArLiJo, No. 136 (2020).
- "Nature's Job." Necro Magazine, No. 4 (Culture) (Winter, 2020).
- "Woodstock Phone Call." Eugene Public Library Short Story Dispenser (2022). https://eugene.short-edition.com/story/woodstock-phone-call
- "The Park's Hour." Fresh Words, Vol. 2, No. 2. (May 2022), 22–24.
- "After the Fire." Coneflower Review (Spring 2023), 35–42. In The Best of Choeofpleirn Press (Winter 2023), 3–11.
- "Can't Forgive." Bronze Bird Review (2024).
- "The Keys to the Messiah." Creation Magazine (Winter 2025), 56–65.
- “Ithaca, Again,” Stone Canoe, No. 19 (2025). 125–139.
- "Excerpt from a New Novel: Terminal Sales," Emerald Literary Guild Anthology of Windfall Writers, 2026. 157–158.
- "Woodstock Phone Call," Emerald Literary Guild Anthology of Windfall Writers, 2026. 155–156.

== Awards and achievements ==
- Story nominated for the O.Henry Award, 2023.
- Stories nominated for the Pushcart Prize, 2003, 2006, 2007, 2023.
- Honorable Mention, Richard C. Hall Memorial Short Story Competition, Lambda Literary Festival, 2003
- Winner, Gertrude Press Fiction Chapbook Competition, 2006
- First place, Gertrude Press Short Story Contest, 2015
- Honorable Mention, Southern California Book Festival, 2015
- Starred review of The Dahlia Field, Kirkus Reviews, 2017
- Honorable Mention, Paris Book Festival—General Fiction, 2017
- Honorable Mention, San Francisco Book Festival—Gay,2017
- Story selected for Best of Gay Fiction 2017, Lethe Press.
- The Dahlia Field selected as one of Kirkus Reviews' Best Indie Books of 2017

== References and notes ==
- —Henry Alley's faculty profile and books and reviews
- —Story published in Virginia Quarterly Review
- —review of Precincts of Light
- Author's Page on Amazon
- Complete Interview on Precincts of Light and GLBT Liberation, on YouTube and DiversiTV.
- Reading of short story, "Yard Sale," Lane Writers Reading Series.
- http://klcc.org/post/henry-alley-explores-nuances-gay-relationships-dahlia-field Interview with KLCC on The Dahlia Field
- Guest blog on The Story Prize, 2017
- Expanded text of interview with KLCC on The Dahlia Field
- Review of Men Touching, Lambda Literary.
- https://www.youtube.com/watch?v=asL3Aig9pqY&feature=youtu.be Reading of short story, "The Audubon Marathon," River Road Reading Series
- https://rattlinggoodyarns.com/authors/henry-alley/ Author's Page, Rattling Good Yarns Press, complete with readings from Galen's Legacy.
- https://www.youtube.com/watch?v=qiyQvxLkyWU, Story, "The Park's Hour," read from Fresh Words, May 2022.
- https://eugenescene.org/book-review/ Review of Galen's Legacy, Eugene Scene.
- https://www.youtube.com/watch?v=Ux3wrcQ27xg Reading from Galen's Legacy in Lane Literary Guild Windfall Series, January 2023.
