= William Nassau Alley =

Irish Methodist

William Nassau Alley (1808 – June 1849) was an Irish Methodist.

Alley was a native of Ballinasloe and is credited with much of the responsibility for the erection of the Methodist chapel of Galway, at what was later to be known as Victoria Place. In 1836 he and his wife Mary had only recently set up business as merchants in the town, where he was acknowledged as one of the leading members of the community. Thanks mainly to their efforts, the chapel was opened in 1839.

Galway was one of the worst affected areas in Ireland during the Great Irish Famine, and members of the community risked their lives in attempting to save the lives of their fellow Irish. While assisting the sick and hungry, Alley became infected with fever and died in June 1849. His wife, Mary, died in 1863, aged 62. Both of them were buried at the back of chapel at Victoria Place, over which an impressive monument with a Corinthian pillar was erected.

He was an older brother of George Alley.
