= Richard Akuson =

Nigerian lawyer, LGBTQ+ rights activist, essayist, and editor

Richard Akuson Esq
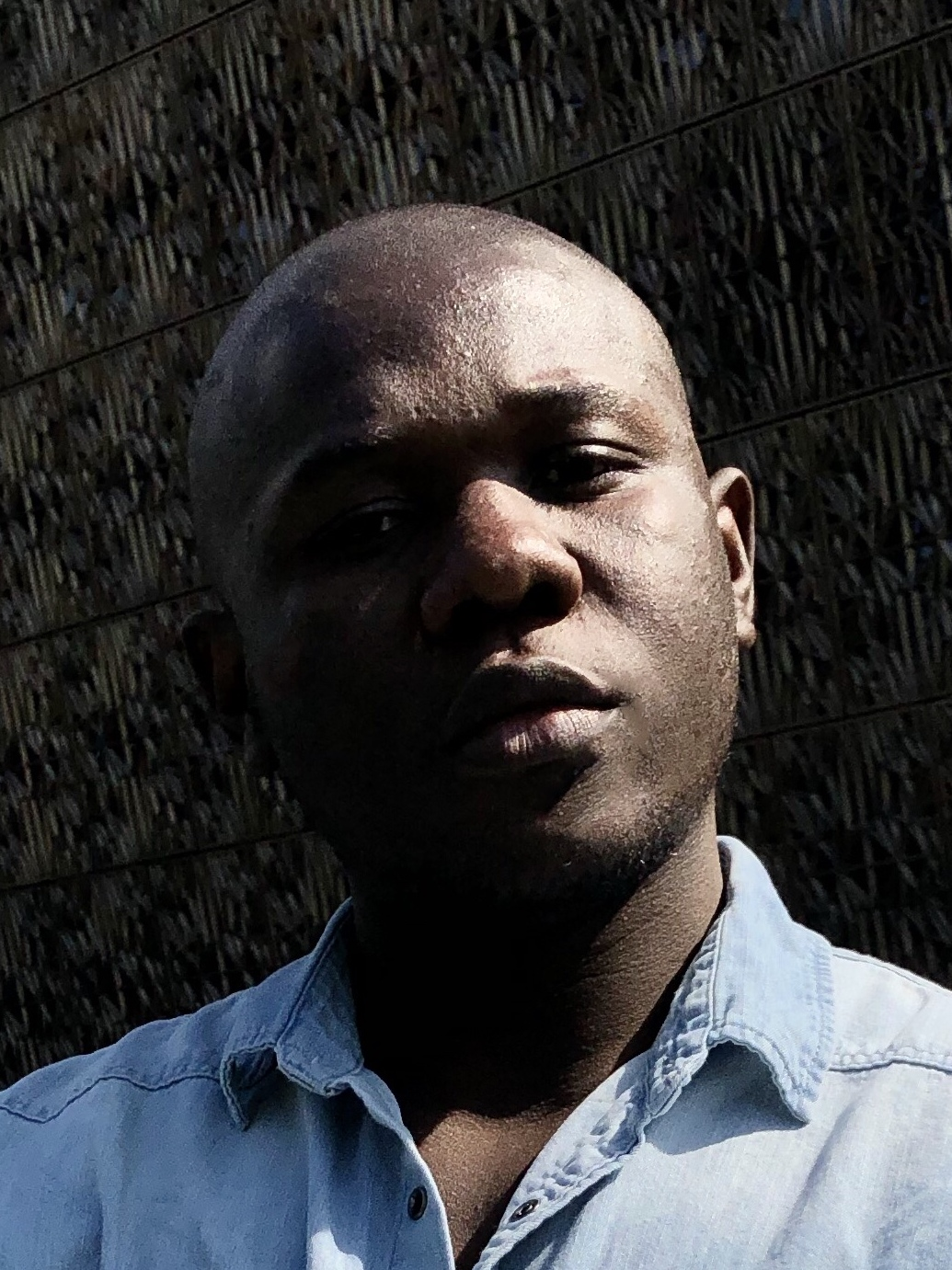
- Richard Akuson at The National Museum of African American History and Culture in Washington D.C.
- Born: July 26, 1993 (age 33)
- Education: Nasarawa State University, Keffi, and Nigerian Law School, Lagos.
- Known for: LGBTQ+ activism
- Title: Founder and editor of A Nasty Boy
- Honours: Forbes Africa 30 Under 30 (2019)

Richard Akuson (born July 26, 1993) is a Nigerian lawyer, LGBT rights activist, writer, editor, and the founder of A Nasty Boy magazine, Nigeria's first LGBTQ+ publication. In 2019, Akuson was named one of Forbes Africa's 30 Under 30 change-makers for challenging rigid notions of masculinity, gender, and sexuality in Nigeria where homosexual acts can be punished with 14 years in prison. In 2017, he was nominated for The Future Awards Africa's New Media Innovation Award. Akuson is also a two-time Abryanz Style & Fashion Award Best Fashion Writer nominee. Following the launch of A Nasty Boy magazine in 2017, he was named one of the 40 Most Powerful Nigerians under the age of 40 by YNaija.

== Early life and education ==
Richard Akuson was born in Akwanga, Nasarawa State, Nigeria. The second of three boys, he was raised in an upper-middle-class family; his father, a politician, and his mother, a college lecturer. He attended Shepherd's International College, a private, co-educational Christian boarding school, before heading to the Nasarawa State University, Keffi, for his first professional degree in law. He was called to the Nigerian Bar as a Barrister and Solicitor of the Supreme Court of Nigeria in 2017, upon his graduation from the Nigerian Law School, Lagos.

== Career ==
Akuson started his career as a style intern at the age of 18. In 2014, he co-founded ILLUDED, an online photo-sharing platform. In 2016, he was offered a position to head BellaNaija's fashion and style sections—a position that launched his career through the roof. His work at BellaNaija earned him an Abryanz Style & Fashion Award nomination for Fashion Writer of the Year in 2016. Later that year, he left BellaNaija to launch The PR Boy, a boutique PR firm that catered primarily to Nigerian startups. In 2017, while at the Nigerian Law School, he launched A Nasty Boy, the boundary-pushing LGBTQ+ publication that soon grew in stature and international acclaim.

== Essays ==
In April 2019, Akuson authored a searing, tell-all essay for CNN detailing the circumstances that led him to flee Nigeria for safety in America. In July 2019, he wrote a heart-rending essay for The New York Times' "Sunday Review." The essay, "This is Quite Gay," was prominently published in the Times' web front page and appeared on a similarly prominent position in print, the next day.

== Activism and asylum ==
Akuson sought asylum in America in 2018 after fleeing Nigeria upon surviving a brutal homophobic attack. In the U.S., he continues to speak openly about the attack and the insidious culture of homophobia in Nigeria. He has granted interviews to OkayAfrica, Very Good Light, and The Black Youth Project, where he gave great detail surrounding the event. Akuson continues to be an outspoken activist for the LGBTQ+ and asylum communities in America.
