= Rick Alley =

American poet

Rick Alley is an American poet. He is the author of the book, Talking Book of July (Eastern Washington Press, 1997) He is also the author of August Machine, a chapbook of lyrical poems. He grew up in Virginia Beach, Virginia and studied at both the Old Dominion University and at the MFA Program for Poets & Writers at the University of Massachusetts Amherst in Amherst, Massachusetts. He has held editorial positions with Associated Writing Programs and Marquee. He lives in Norfolk, Virginia, where he teaches creative writing. His poetry has also appeared in the book "The Next Generation, American Poets Under 40" (Carnegie Mellon Press).
