= Julia Stephen =

Philanthropist and model, mother of Virginia Woolf

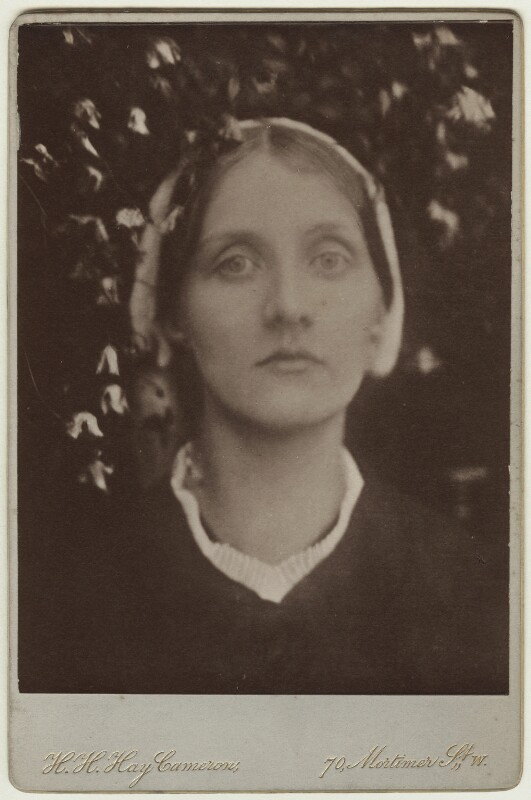
- Stephen photographed in 1872
- Born: Julia Prinsep Jackson; 7 February 1846; Calcutta, Bengal Presidency
- Died: 5 May 1895 (aged 49); London, England
- Occupations: Pre-Raphaelite model Philanthropist
- Children: 7, including Virginia Woolf

Julia Prinsep Stephen (née Jackson; formerly Duckworth; 7 February 1846 – 5 May 1895) was an English Pre-Raphaelite model and philanthropist. She was the wife of the biographer Leslie Stephen and mother of Virginia Woolf and Vanessa Bell, members of the Bloomsbury Group.

Julia Prinsep Jackson was born in Calcutta to an Anglo-Indian family, and when she was two her mother and her two sisters moved back to England. She became the favourite model of her aunt, the celebrated photographer Julia Margaret Cameron, who made more than 50 portraits of her. Through another maternal aunt, she became a frequent visitor at Little Holland House, then home to an important literary and artistic circle, and came to the attention of a number of Pre-Raphaelite painters who portrayed her in their work.

Married to Herbert Duckworth, a barrister, in 1867 she was soon widowed with three infant children. Devastated, she turned to nursing, philanthropy and agnosticism, and found herself attracted to the writing and life of Leslie Stephen, with whom she shared a friend in Anny Thackeray, his sister-in-law.

After Leslie Stephen's wife died in 1875 he became close friends with Julia and they married in 1878. Julia and Leslie Stephen had four further children, living at 22 Hyde Park Gate, South Kensington, together with his seven-year-old mentally disabled daughter, Laura Makepeace Stephen. Many of her seven children and their descendants became notable. In addition to her family duties and modelling, she wrote a book based on her nursing experiences, Notes from Sick Rooms, in 1883.

She also wrote children's stories for her family, eventually published posthumously as Stories for Children and became involved in social justice advocacy. Julia Stephen had firm views on the role of women, namely that their work was of equal value to that of men, but in different spheres, and she opposed the suffrage movement for votes for women. The Stephens entertained many visitors at their London home and their summer residence at St Ives, Cornwall. Eventually the demands on her both at home and outside the home started to take their toll. Julia Stephen died at her home following an episode of rheumatic fever in 1895, at the age of 49, when her youngest child was only 11. The writer Virginia Woolf provides a number of insights into the domestic life of the Stephens in both her autobiographical and fictional work.

== Life ==
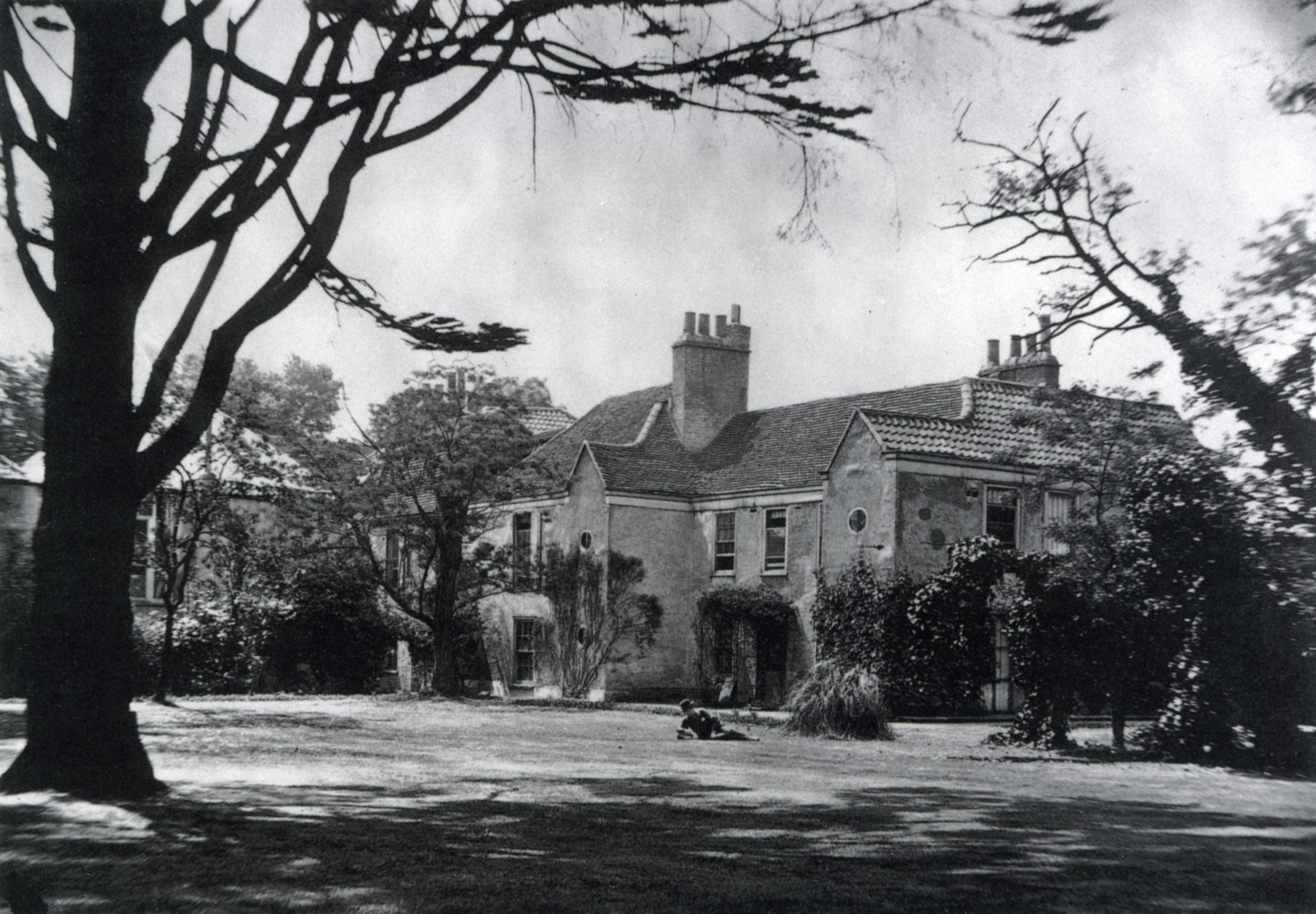
Little Holland House, Kensington, demolished 1875

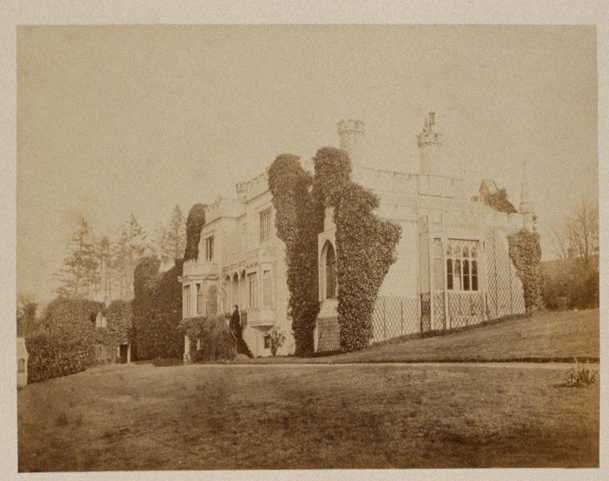
Saxonbury, the Jacksons' home in East Sussex from 1866

=== Family ===
Julia Stephen was born in Calcutta, Bengal, then the capital of British India, on 7 February 1846, as Julia Prinsep Jackson. Her parents, Maria "Mia" Theodosia Pattle (1818–1892) and John Jackson (1804–1887), (Note: Dr Jackson died at Hove, where he and his wife were then living, on 31 March 1887) belonged to two Anglo-Indian families, although Maria's mother, Adeline Marie Pattle (née de l'Etang), was French. Her father, a Cambridge educated physician who spent 25 years (1830–1855) with the Bengal Medical Service and the East India Company, and a professor at the fledgling Calcutta Medical College, was the third son of George Jackson and Mary Howard of Bengal. While Dr Jackson came from humble origins, but had a successful career that brought him into circles of influence, the Pattles moved naturally in the upper echelons of Anglo-Bengali society. Maria Pattle was the fifth of seven sisters famed for their beauty, verve and eccentricity, and who inherited some Bengali blood through their maternal grandmother, Thérèse Josephe Blin de Grincourt. They spoke Hindustani among themselves, and were a sensation on their visits to London and Paris. (Note: The Pattle sisters would stay with their maternal grandmother, in Versailles, where they received their education)

By contrast with the colourful Maria, Jackson was less overt, and tolerant of her passion for her friend, the poet Coventry Patmore. Jackson and Maria Pattle were married in Calcutta on 17 January 1837 and had six children, of whom Julia was the youngest, the third of three surviving daughters, Adeline Maria (1837–1881), Mary Louisa (1840–1916) and Julia (see Table of ancestors). They had two sons and a daughter. The Jacksons were a well educated, literary, and artistic proconsular middle-class family.

=== Early life (1846–1867) ===
Julia's two older sisters were sent to England for reasons of health in 1846 to stay with her mother's sister Sarah Monckton Pattle and her husband Henry Prinsep, who leased Little Holland House in Kensington in 1850. Julia and her mother joined them in 1848 when Julia was two. Later the family moved to Well Walk, Hampstead. Her father followed them to England, from India, in 1855, the family living in Hendon at Brent Lodge on Brent Lane, where Julia was home schooled. Julia's sisters, Mary and Adeline were married shortly after. Adeline married Henry Vaughan ("Harry") in 1856 (Note: Vaughan was Regius Professor of History at Oxford (1848–1858) but retired shortly after their marriage, to Upton Castle in Pembrokeshire) and Mary married Herbert Fisher in 1862, (Note: Herbert Fisher was also a historian) leaving Julia as her mother's companion and caretaker. Her mother's long history of ill health dates from around 1856, and Julia would accompany her on her travels to find remedies. On one of these, where they visited her sister (now Mary Fisher.) in Venice in 1862, she encountered her new brother-in-law's friend, Herbert Duckworth (1833−1870), whom she would later marry. In 1866 the Jacksons moved to Saxonbury, in Frant, near Tunbridge Wells. There she would meet the agnostic biographer Leslie Stephen (1832–1904) later that year, shortly before his engagement to Minny Thackeray. Stephen eventually became her second husband. He described Saxonbury as "a good country house with a pleasant garden and two or three fields".

The Pattle sisters and their families (see Pattle family tree) provided important connections for Julia and her mother. As Quentin Bell, Julia's grandson, described it, they had "a certain awareness of social possibilities". Sarah Monckton Pattle (1816-1887), had married Henry Thoby Prinsep (1793–1878), an administrator with the East India Company, and their home at Little Holland House was an important intellectual centre and influence on Julia, that she would later describe to her children as "bohemian". Little Holland House, a farmhouse on the Holland estate, that served as the dower house, was then on the outskirts of London, and nicknamed the "Enchanted Palace", where Sarah Prinsep ran the equivalent of a French salon. Quentin Bell states that Julia was "largely brought up in" Little Holland House. The house was also frequented by Leslie Stephen. One of the Prinseps' sons, another of Julia's many cousins, was the artist, Valentine Cameron Prinsep (1838–1904).

Another of Maria Jackson's sisters was Virginia Pattle (1827–1910), who married (1850) Lord Charles Eastnor, later the third Earl Somers (1819–1883). Their eldest daughter (Julia's cousin) was Lady Isabella Caroline Somers-Cocks (1851–1921), the temperance leader, while the younger, Lady Adeline Marie (1852–1920) became the Duchess of Bedford. Julia and her mother were frequent guests at Eastnor Castle, the home of Lord Charles and Lady Virginia. Another maternal aunt, and also her godmother, Julia Margaret Pattle (Julia Margaret Cameron 1815–1879), was a celebrated photographer, who took many photographs of her niece, and created a photograph album for her sister, Maria in 1863 (the Mia Album).

Sarah Prinsep and her sisters were adept at making great men feel at ease, and they frequented her house. There one might find Disraeli, Carlyle, Tennyson and Rossetti taking tea and playing croquet, while the painter George Frederic Watts (1817–1904) lived and worked there, as did for a while Edward Burne-Jones (1833–1898). It was at Little Holland House that Julia came to the attention of these Pre-Raphaelite painters and also William Holman Hunt (1827–1910), for all of whom she modelled as well as (see Gallery I) Frederick Leighton (1830–1896). She was also introduced to writers such as William Thackeray (1828–1909) and George Meredith (1828–1909), and formed a friendship with Thackeray's daughters, Anne (1837–1919) and Harriet Marian "Minny" (1840–1875). Julia was much admired, her mother observing that every man who met her in a railway carriage fell in love with her, and indeed everyone did love her. Leonard Woolf described her as "one of the most beautiful women in England". In 1864, at the age of 18, she declined marriage proposals from both Hunt and the sculptor, Thomas Woolner, another Pre-Raphaelite, who was devastated when she married three years later. Leslie Stephen remarked that Hunt only married his second wife, Edith Waugh, because she resembled Julia. Another sculptor for whom she modelled, and who was enamoured with her, was Carlo Marochetti (1805–1867). She was his model for the memorial to the young Princess Elizabeth (daughter of Charles I), (Note: Elizabeth died in 1650 at the age of 14. Queen Victoria commissioned the memorial in 1856 for the church of Sts Thomas Minster, Isle of Wight, where Elizabeth was buried) when she was 10 years old, and he created a bust of Julia Jackson that is now at the Charleston Farmhouse, in Sussex. Throughout her life, she had no lack of admirers. These included the U.S. Ambassador, Russell Lowell. and Henry James. At 5 feet 6 inches (1.68 metres) she was tall for a Victorian woman and had large, practical hands, deriding "the lovely filbert nails which are the pride of many", (Note: Filbert (hazelnut) nails were greatly prized by Victorians, as a sign of refinement. They were a demure pink oval with a white crescent tip) shunning vanity, fashion and affectation.

The Jackson Family

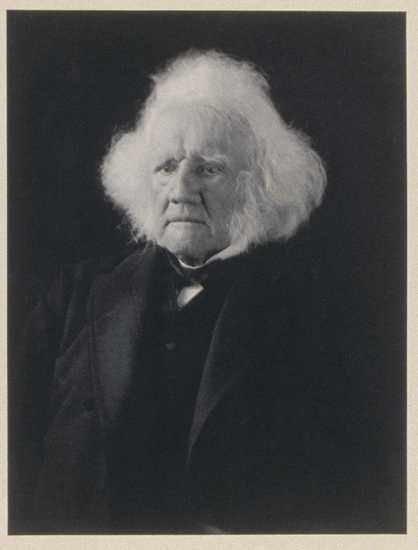
1. John Jackson (1804–1887), c.1883

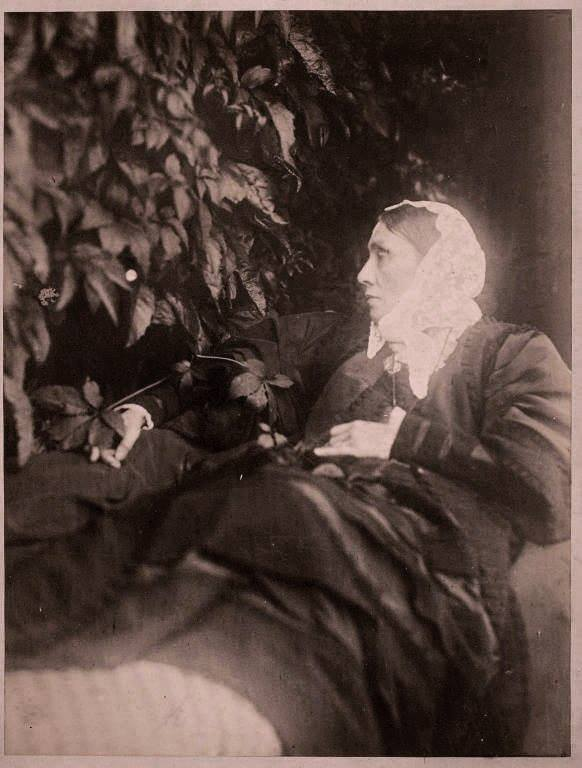
2. Maria Jackson (1818–1892), c. 1872–4

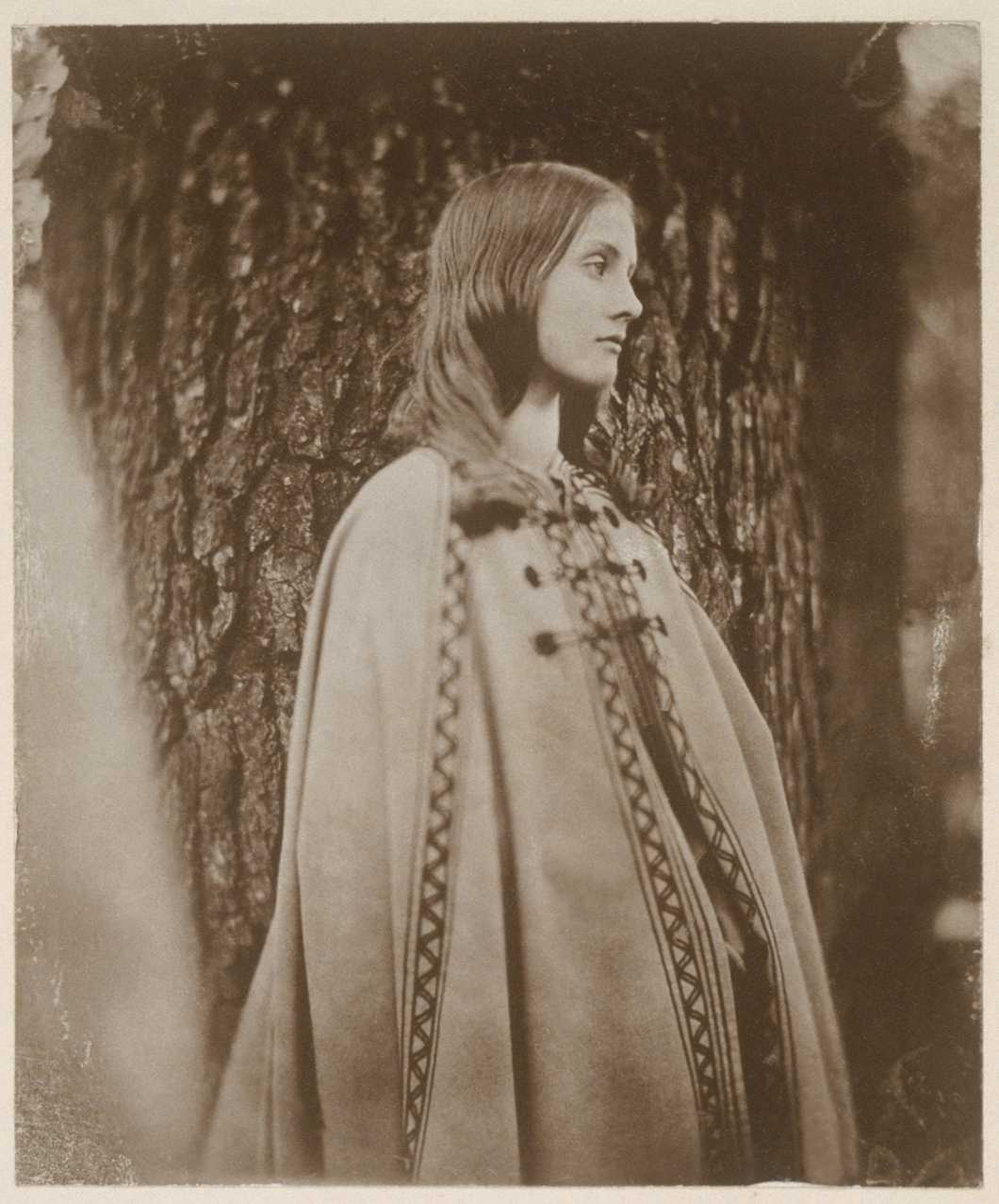
Julia Prinsep Jackson 1860, age 14

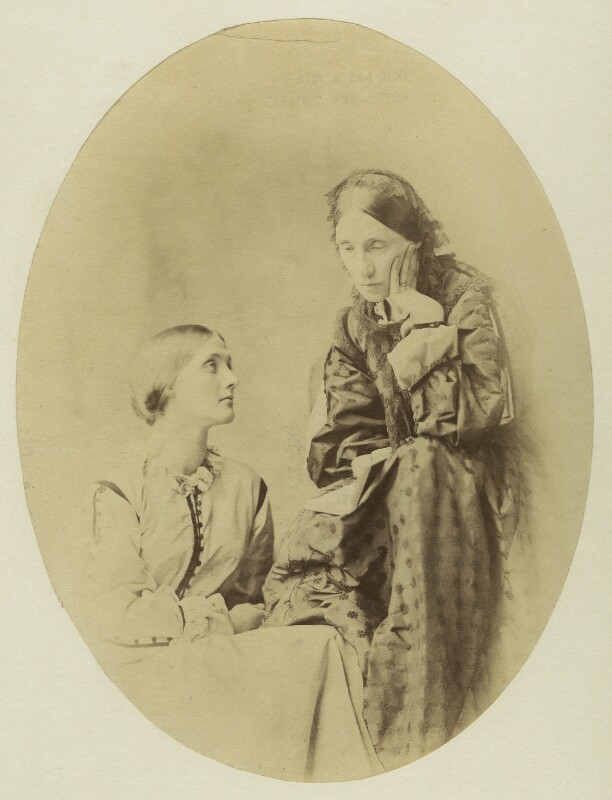
3. Julia Jackson and her mother c. 1867

1, 3. Anonymous; 2, 4 Julia Margaret Cameron

=== Marriage ===
==== (1) Herbert Duckworth 1867–1870 ====
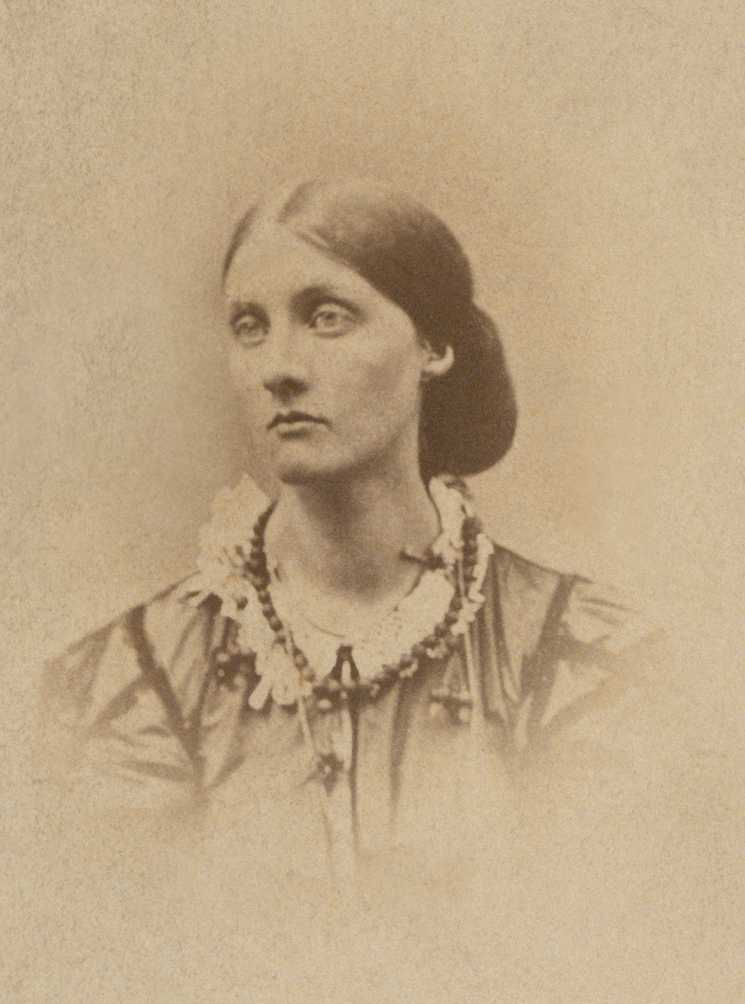
Julia Duckworth c. 1870

On 1 February 1867, at the age of 21, Julia became engaged to Herbert Duckworth, a member of the Somerset landed gentry, (Note: Herbert Duckworth, was born on 19 May 1833, the fourth son of William Duckworth Esq. (1795–1876) and Hester-Emily Philips (d. 1834)) a graduate of Cambridge University and Lincoln's Inn (1858), and now a barrister and they were married on 4 May at Frant. Julia Margaret Cameron took a number of portraits of her during this period, which Cameron considered symbolic of transition. The marriage was a happy one, Julia later stating "no one had tasted more perfect happiness...the greatest happiness that can fall to the lot of a woman". Julia's second husband, Leslie Stephen, had known Herbert Duckworth from when they were at Cambridge together ten years earlier. (Note: Leslie Stephen graduated in mathematics in 1854, Herbert Duckworth in law in 1855)

He described him as "the kind of man who might be expected to settle down as a thorough country gentleman ... simple, straight forward and manly ... a singularly modest and sweet-tempered man". Leslie Stephen felt "a touch of pain" later, in writing about the purity of their love, commenting on her letters to Herbert, he stated that she "made a complete surrender of herself in the fullest sense: she would have no reserves from her lover, and confesses her entire devotion to him". As he read through Julia's letters to Herbert after her death, Leslie had misgivings in comparing "the strength of her passion" at this stage of her life to her later marriage to himself.

The Duckworths lived at 38 Bryanston Square (see images of exterior and interiors), Marylebone, London, a townhouse belonging to the Duckworth family, (Note: The house was demolished in 1940 following damage during The Blitz) and the following year, their first child was born on 5 March 1868. Two other children followed in quick succession. Their third child, Gerald Duckworth, was born six weeks after his father's premature death in September 1870, at the age of 37, from an undiagnosed internal abscess. He was said to be reaching for a fig for her, while they were visiting Julia's sister (now Adeline Vaughan) at Upton Castle, New Milford, Pembrokeshire, when it ruptured. Within twenty-four hours, he was dead.

Julia and Herbert Duckworth had three children;

- George (5 March 1868 – 1934), a senior civil servant
- Stella (30 May 1869 – 1897), died aged 28 (Note: Stella Duckworth was 26 when her mother died, and married Jack Hills (1876–1938) two years later, but died following her honeymoon. She was buried next to her mother)
- Gerald (29 October 1870 – 1937), founder of Duckworth Publishing.
The Duckworth Family

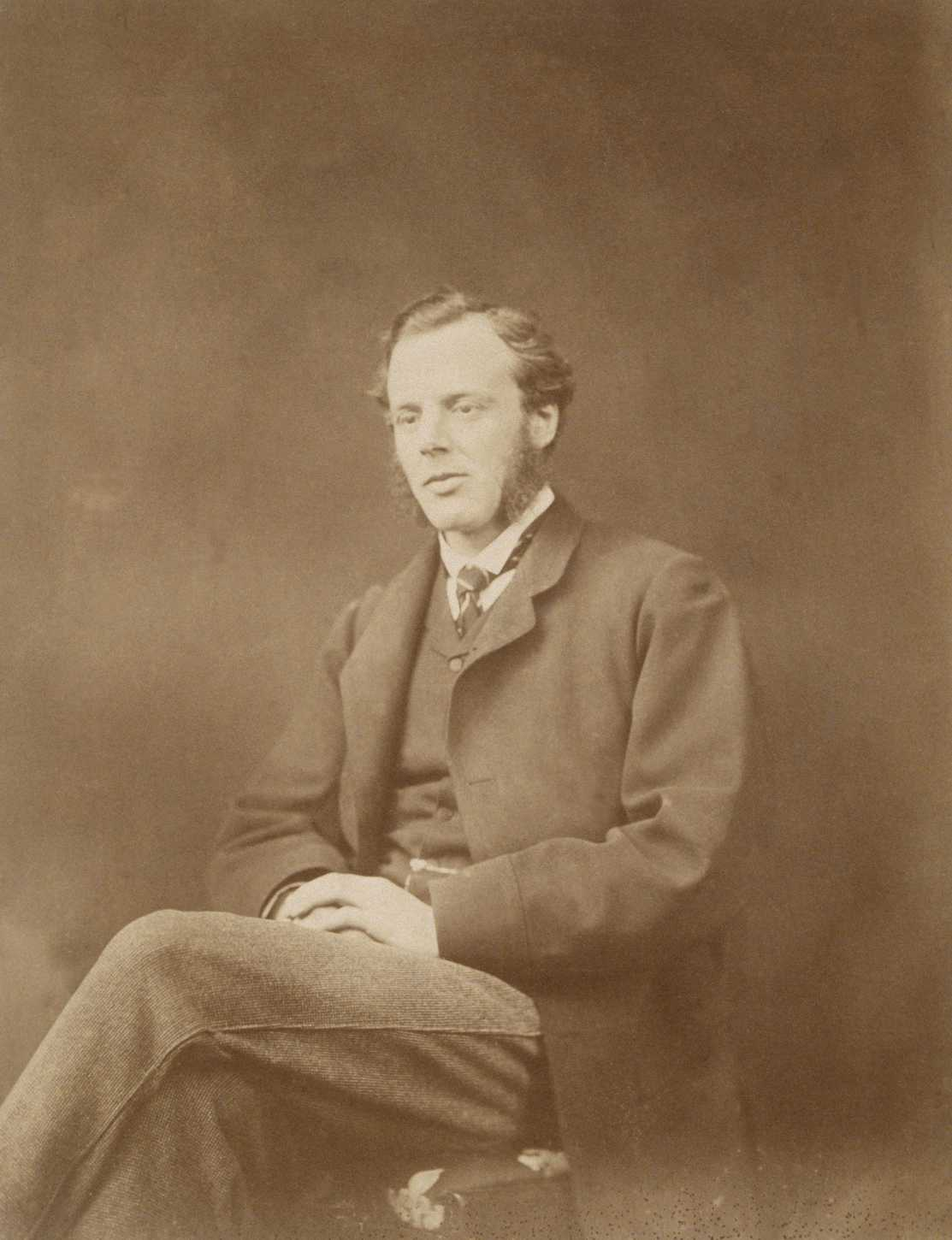
Herbert Duckworth (1833–1870)

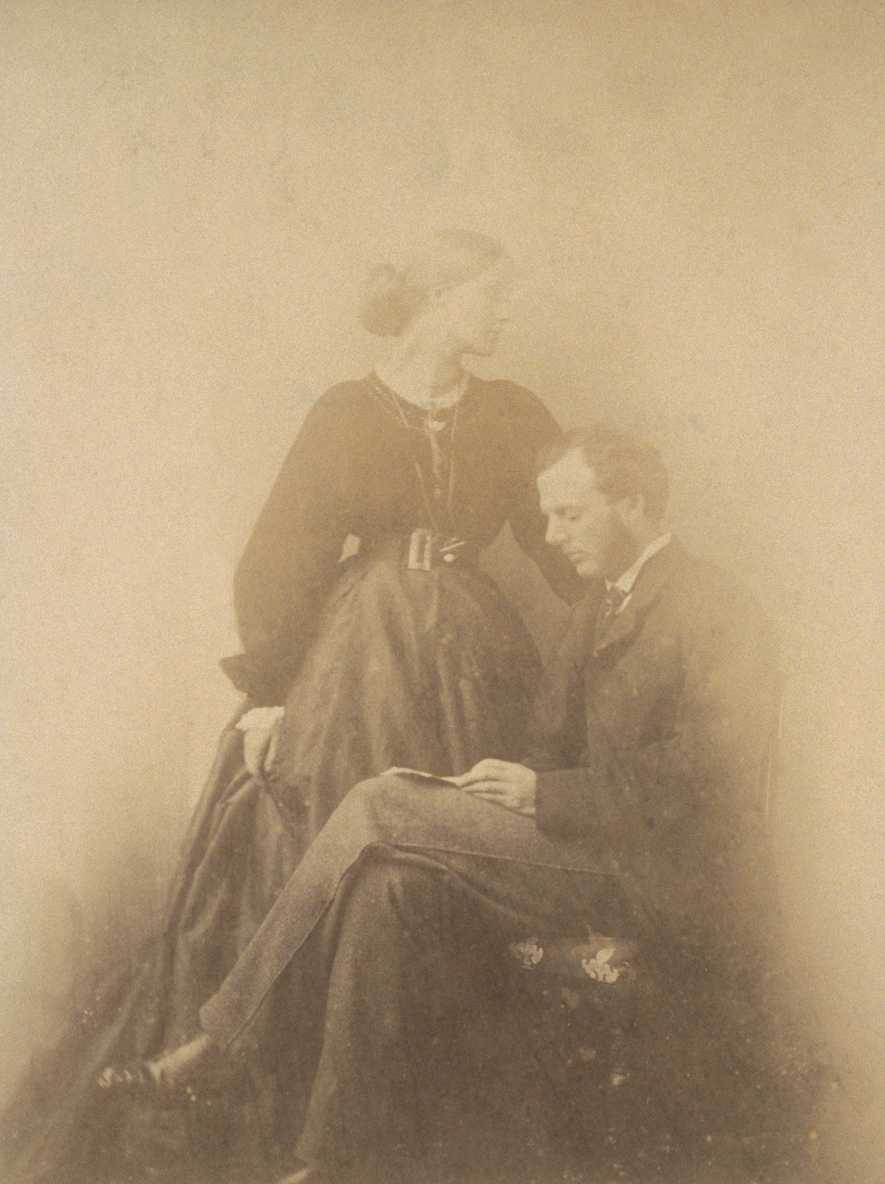
Julia and Herbert Duckworth 1867

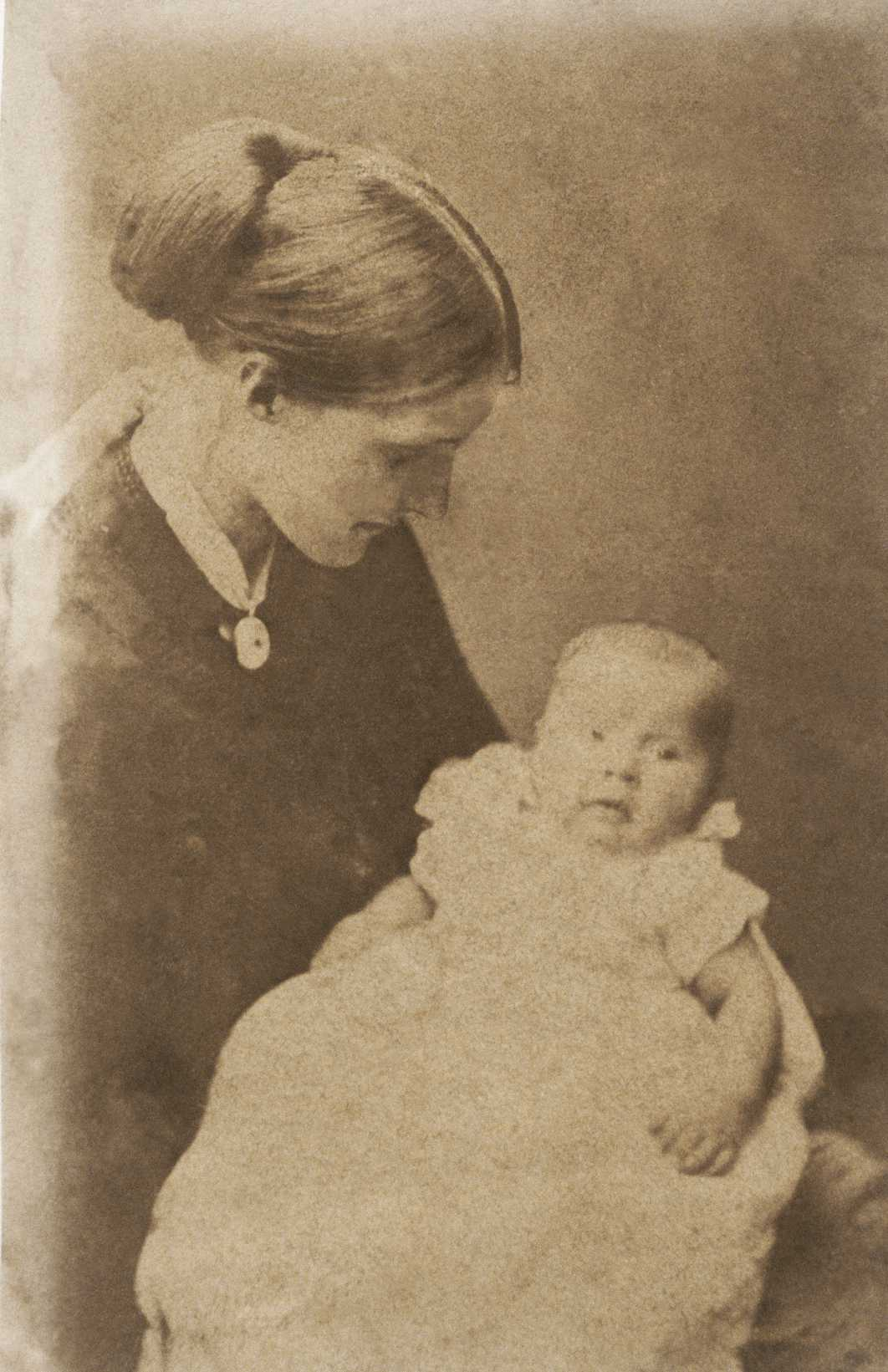
Julia and George Duckworth 1868

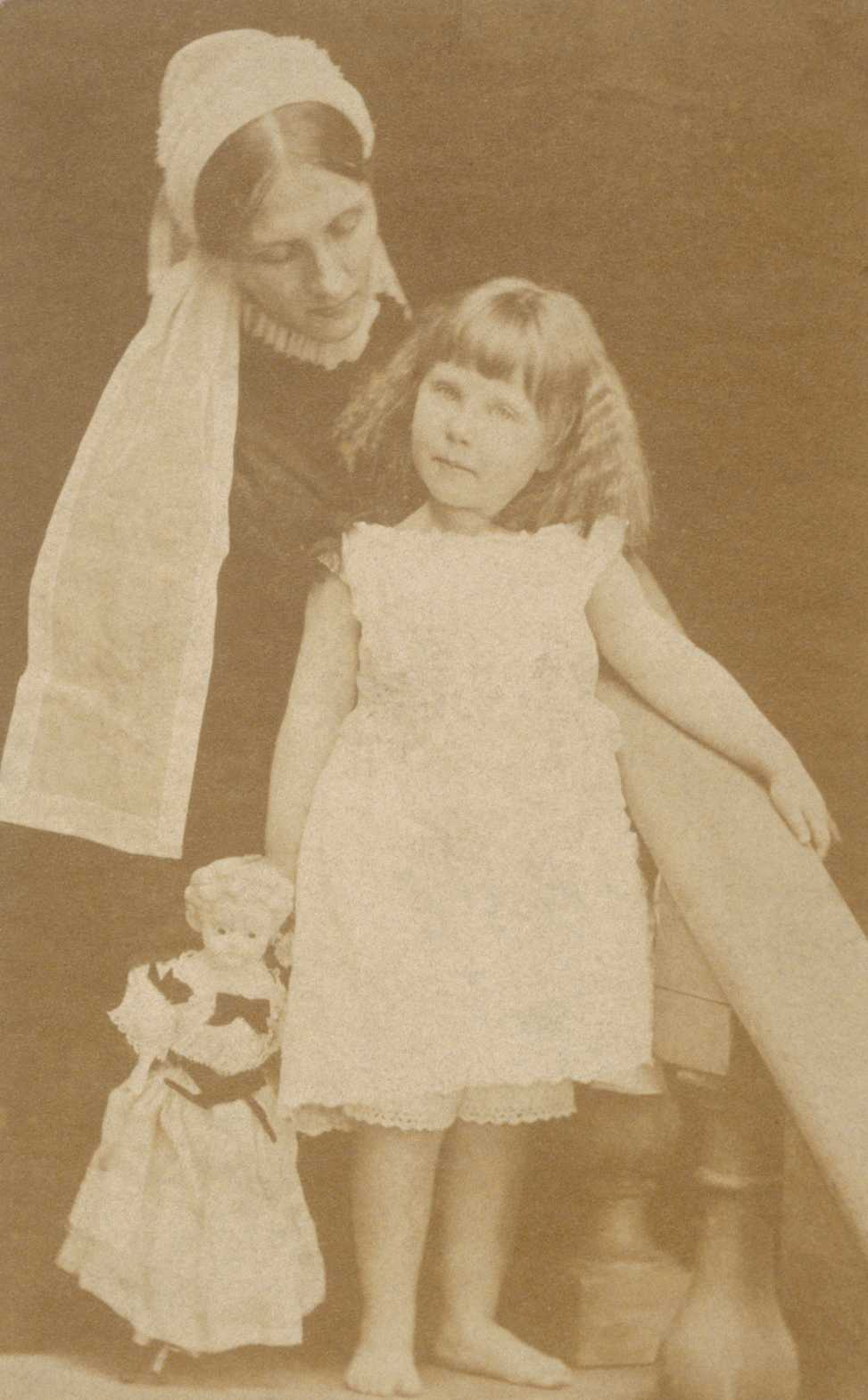
Julia in mourning with Stella c. 1873

==== Mourning 1870–1878 ====
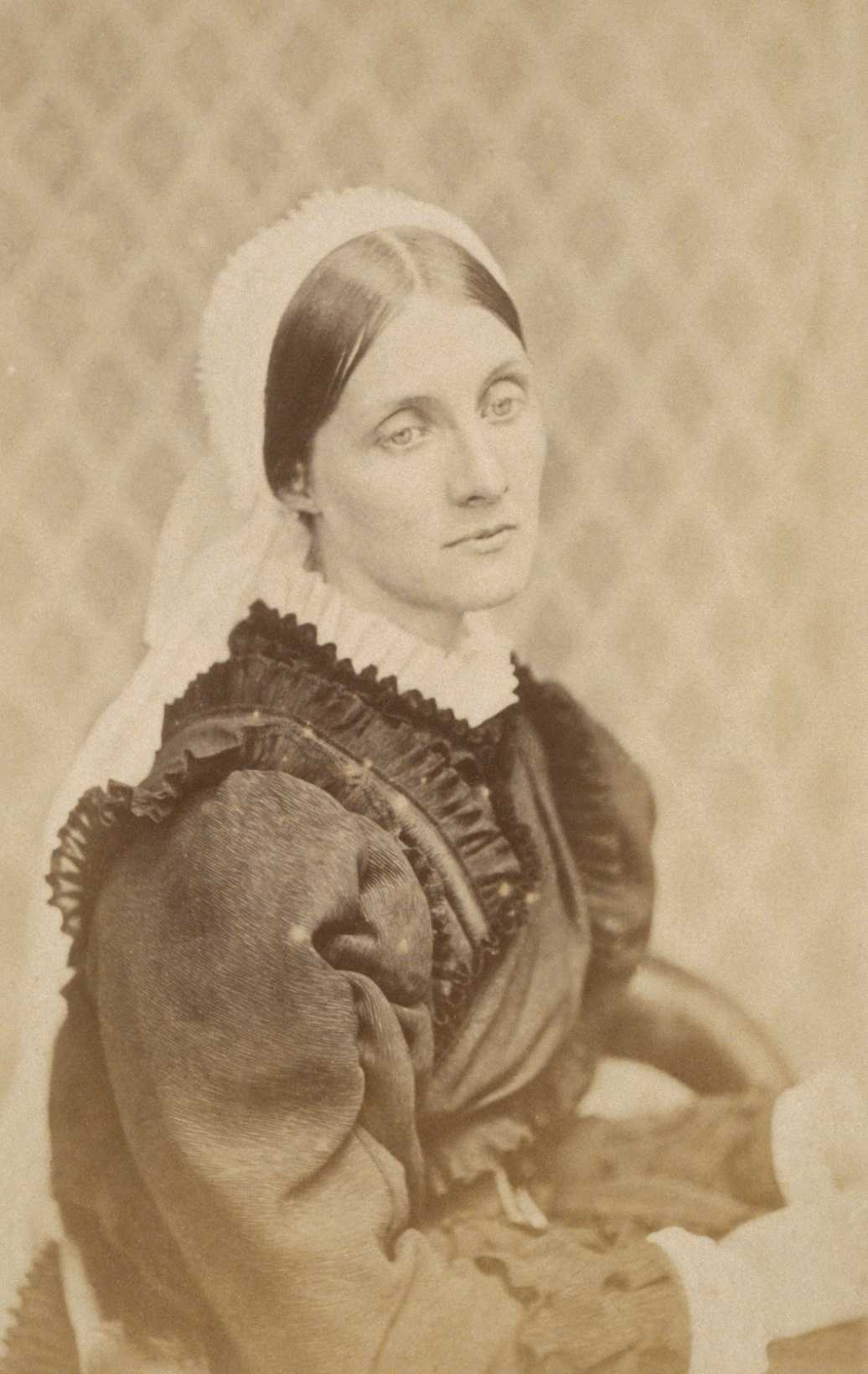
Julia Duckworth in mourning, early 1870s

Married for only three years, Julia was devastated by her husband's death, lying on his grave at his family home of Orchardleigh, near Frome, Somerset. She stated that she was no longer "inclined to optimism", but rather taking on a "melancholy view of life", indeed, to her "life seemed a shipwreck...The world was clothed in drab shrouded in a crape-veil", but kept herself going for the sake of her children. She related this to Leslie Stephen later "I was only 24 when it all seemed a shipwreck, and I knew that I had to live on and on ... And so I got deadened". At the same time, her grief imbued her with a sense of stoicism and awareness of suffering and she made a decision to reject religion, and it appeared, the possibility of happiness. Leslie Stephen observed that "a cloud rested even upon her maternal affections ...it seemed to me at the time that she had accepted sorrow as her lifelong partner", and that "she was like a person reviving from drowning" and sometimes felt as if "she must let herself sink".

It was then that she took up nursing the sick and dying to make herself useful, and began studying the agnostic writing of Leslie Stephen. As Leslie Stephen described it "She became a kind of sister of mercy. Whenever there was trouble, death or illness in her family, the first thing was to send for Julia, whether to comfort survivors or to nurse the patients". After her husband's death, she joined her parents who had moved to Freshwater, Isle of Wight. It was also a period when she spent extensive visits to her aunt, Julia Margaret Cameron's home in Freshwater, who took many photographs of her (see Gallery II). She also resisted her aunt's efforts to persuade her to remarry. (Note: The Camerons built a home in Freshwater, Dimbola Lodge in 1870, and when the lease on Little Holland House in London was not renewed in 1873, Watts arranged for Philip Webb to build the Prinseps a house in Freshwater, The Briary. This soon became the new literary and artistic focus, and was dubbed Little Holland House by the Sea)

==== Friendship to courtship ====
Julia had become aware of Leslie Stephen through both his writings on agnosticism, and through a mutual friend, Anne Thackeray (Anny, 1837–1919), the writer and daughter of William Makepeace Thackeray (see Stephen family tree). Stephen had married Anny's younger sister Minny (Harriet Marian) Thackeray (1840–1875) in 1867, the same year as Julia's marriage, but she died in childbirth in 1875, leaving him with a handicapped daughter, Laura Makepeace Stephen (7 December 1870 – 1945). (Note: Laura was born premature, at 30 weeks) After Harriet's death, Stephen lived with Anny and he became closer to Julia, who helped them move to 11 Hyde Park Gate (when the house numbers were changed in 1884, it became number 20) in South Kensington in June 1876, next door to her at number 13 (later 22). This was a highly respectable part of London, and Leslie Stephen himself had been born at number 14 (later 42). It was hoped that Julia's children would provide some companionship for Laura, who was becoming increasingly difficult to manage, and in 1877 he made Julia one of Laura's guardians. Leslie Stephen and Julia Duckworth had developed a close friendship, as she added him to her list of those who needed caring for, and had visited Leslie and Minny the night of her death. Each was busy mourning, and saw the friendship as just that. (Note: Quention Bell speculates that their relationship formed the background to their mutual friend Henry James' Altar of the Dead) In that friendship, they were able to share their ideals of sorrow, duty and spiritual convalescence. Leslie Stephen, a former Cambridge Don and man of letters, "knew everyone" in the literary and artistic scene, and came from a respectable upper-middle-class family of lawyers, country gentlemen and clergy.

In January 1877, Leslie Stephen decided he was in love with Julia, writing "There was a music running through me... delicious and inspiring. Julia was that strange solemn music to which my whole nature seemed to be set". He proposed to her on 5 February; however, Anny also became engaged to her cousin at the same time, to his displeasure, although Julia intervened on Anny's behalf. Julia declined Leslie's offer of marriage and they agreed to remain friends, although developing an intense correspondence. At the time she entertained thoughts of committing herself to a life of chastity and the happiness she envisaged could be found in a convent. When Anny Thackeray married on 2 August 1877, Julia would soon change her mind, and it was a proposal to install a German housekeeper, Fräulein Klappert, that brought the matter to a head, for both realised this would separate them. Woolf would later speculate that "perhaps there was pity in her love" in addition to "devout admiration for his mind".

==== (2) Leslie Stephen 1878–1895 ====
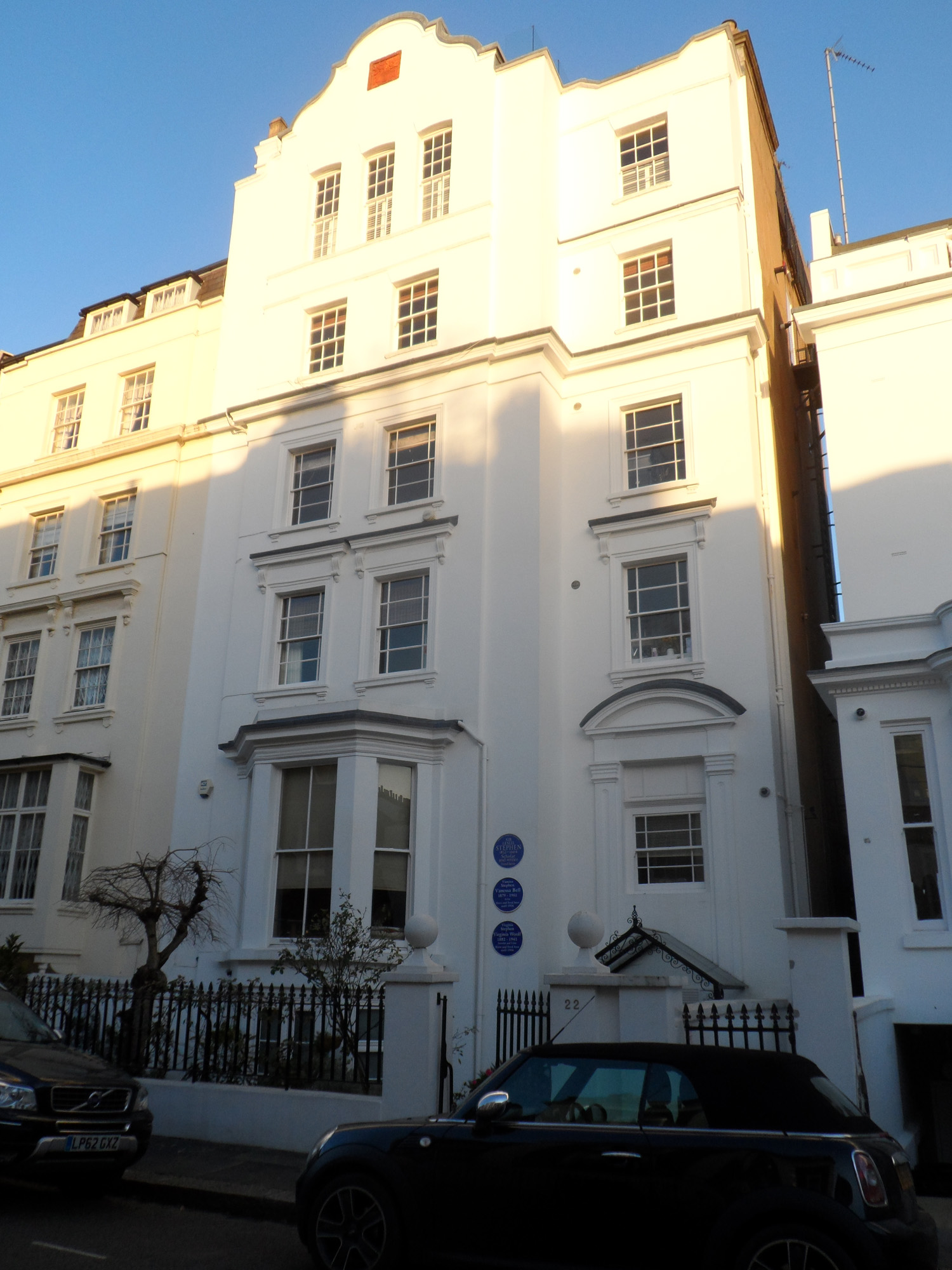
22 Hyde Park Gate, 2015 (Note: The line separating the additional floors of 1886 can be clearly seen)

On 5 January 1878, Julia Duckworth and Leslie Stephen became engaged, and on 26 March they were married at Kensington Church, although she spent much of the period in between nursing her uncle, Henry Prinsep, at Watts's house in Freshwater, till he died on 11 February. Julia was 32 and Leslie was 46. After spending several weeks visiting her sister, Virginia, at Eastnor Castle, Leslie and his seven-year-old daughter Laura moved next door to Julia's house at 13 (22) Hyde Park Gate (see image), and live out her life, and that of the family till her husband's death in 1904. Meanwhile, she continued her modelling career, Burne-Jones's Annunciation being completed in 1879, and their first child, Vanessa, was born shortly after on 30 May. Julia, having presented her husband with a child, and now having five children to care for, had decided to limit her family to this. However, despite the fact that the couple took "precautions", "contraception was a very imperfect art in the nineteenth century", and three more children were born over the next four years. (Note: As Virginia Wool puts it, they "did what they could to prevent me") Angelica Garnett describes Adrian, the last, as "an unwanted child [who] was spoiled, over protected and inhibited".

It was a happy marriage, as Leslie Stephen describes it, a "deep strong current of calm inward happiness". Of their children, he wrote "our own children were to her a pure delight. To see her with a baby on her breast was a revelation, and her love grew with their growth". The Stephens both had aristocratic connections, were considered to belong to the "intellectual aristocracy" and despite Leslie Stephen's obsession with money and fear of poverty, were quite well off financially. They belonged to a social strata of the well educated, who though not wealthy, had inherited sufficient resources to pursue their chosen vocations, a group that at the time was well defined. To many, the Stephens were the ideal Victorian parents, a leading man of letters and a woman admired for beauty, wit, bravery and self-sacrifice. He treated her as a goddess, and in return she pampered him. However, Julia informed him that she could never give up her nursing vocation, and that "I may be called away to nurse people for weeks or have invalids in my house for weeks".

In the early 1880s Leslie Stephen read Froude's life of Carlyle (1882). Like many of his contemporaries he was shocked to learn how badly (he considered) Carlyle had treated his wife, Jane Welsh and wondered if anyone would consider his marriage to have the same flaws, and indeed both shared the tendency to be domestic tyrants. Leslie, who had been a keen mountaineer in the 1860s, suffered a breakdown in 1888 connected with his work on the Dictionary of National Biography, necessitating a three-week visit by them to the Swiss Alps, an occasion documented by Leslie's friend Gabriel Loppé, including one of their particular favourites, in which Julia is peering out of a sunlit hotel room (see below). Laura Stephen became increasingly problematic with outbursts of violence and, confined to a separate part of the house, required her own nurse to feed and clothe her. Eventually she was sent away to a governess in Devon in 1886 (Note: Laura would spend some time with the family in Cornwall in the summers) and eventually an asylum (Earlswood Asylum 1893–1897 in Surrey). The family had little contact with her after that. In 1891, Vanessa and Virginia Stephen began the Hyde Park Gate News, chronicling life and events within the Stephen family, while the following year the Stephen sisters also used photography to supplement their insights, as did Stella Duckworth. Vanessa Bell's 1892 portrait of her sister and parents in the Library at Talland House (see image 5, below) was one of the family's favourites, and was written about lovingly in Leslie Stephen's memoir.

==== 22 Hyde Park Gate ====
Number 22 Hyde Park Gate, South Kensington, lay at the south east end of Hyde Park Gate, a narrow cul-de-sac running south from Kensington Road, just west of the Royal Albert Hall, and opposite Kensington Gardens and Hyde Park, where the family regularly took their walks (see Map). Built in the early nineteenth century as one of a row of single family townhouses for the upper middle class, it soon became too small for their expanding family. At the time of their marriage, it consisted of a basement, two storeys and an attic. In 1886 substantial renovations added a new top floor, converted the attic into rooms, and added the first bathroom. (Note: The Survey of London considers this renovation an example of insensitive and inappropriate mutilation, adding two brick-faced stories to a stucco-fronted house.) It was a tall but narrow townhouse, that at that time had no running water. The servants worked "downstairs" in the basement. The ground floor had a drawing room, separated by a curtain from the servant's pantry and a library. Above this on the first floor were Julia and Leslie's bedrooms. On the next floor were the Duckworth children's rooms, and above them the day and night nurseries of the Stephen children occupied two further floors. Finally in the attic, under the eaves, were the servant's bedrooms, accessed by a back staircase. The house was described as dimly lit and crowded with furniture and paintings. Within it the younger Stephens formed a close-knit group. Life in London differed sharply from that in Cornwall, their outdoor activities consisting mainly of walks in nearby Hyde Park, and their daily activities around their lessons.

==== Talland House (1882–1894) ====
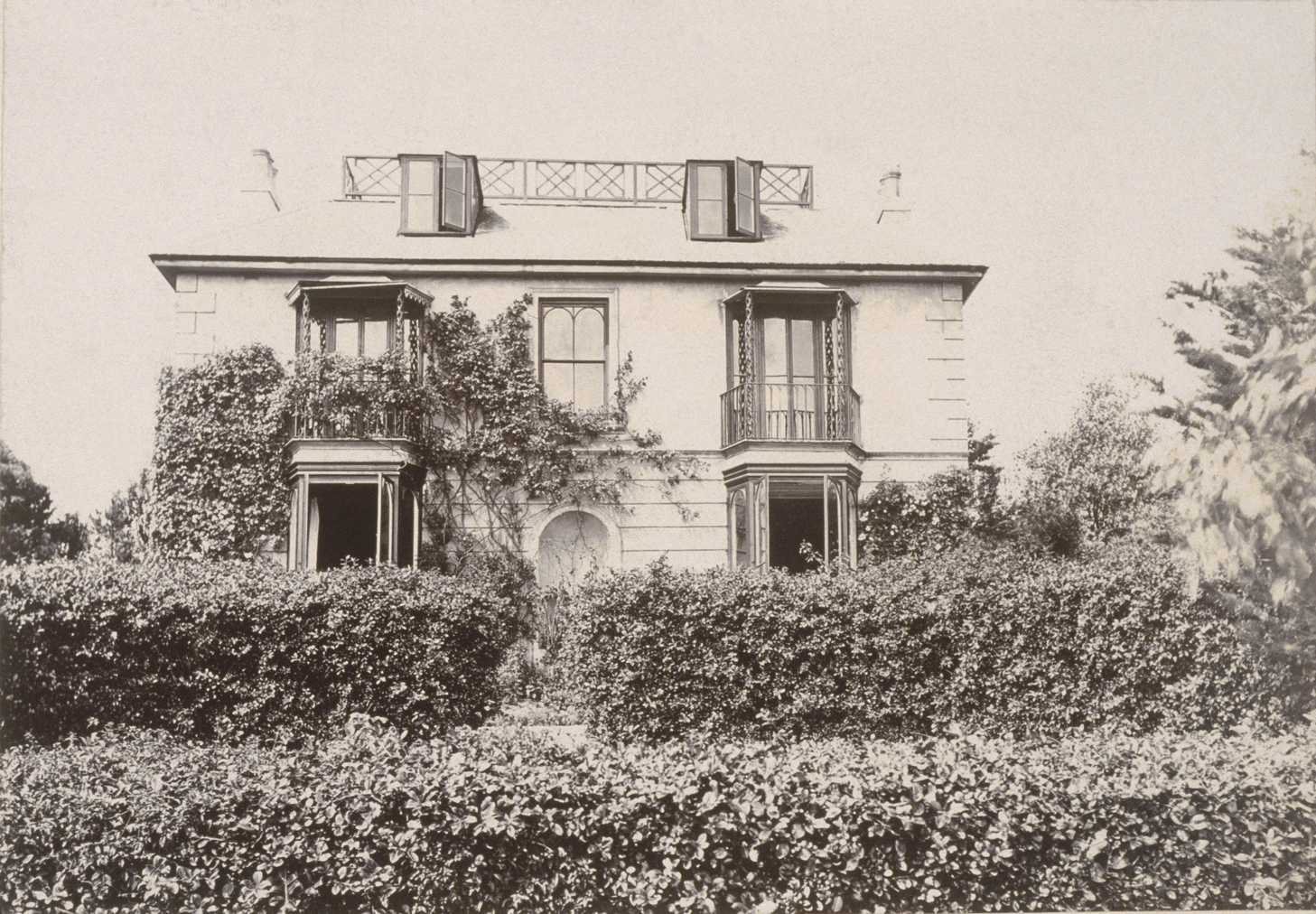
Talland House, St Ives, c. 1882–1895

Leslie Stephen was in the habit of hiking in Cornwall, and in the spring of 1881 he came across a house in St Ives, and took out a lease on it that September. Although it had limited amenities, (Note: There was no furniture upstairs and the cold water tap did not function) its main attraction was the view overlooking Porthminster Bay towards the Godrevy Lighthouse, which the young Virginia could see from the upper windows and which was to become the central figure in her novel To the Lighthouse (1927). It was a large, square house, with a terraced garden, divided by hedges, sloping down toward the sea. Each year between 1882 and 1894, from mid-July to mid-September, the Stephens leased Talland House (Note: On Albert Road, off Talland Road) as a summer residence. Leslie Stephen, who referred to it as "a pocket-paradise", described it as "The pleasantest of my memories... refer to our summers, all of which were passed in Cornwall, especially to the thirteen summers (1882-1894) at St Ives. There we bought the lease of Talland House: a small but roomy house, with a garden of an acre or two all up and down hill, with quaint little terraces divided by hedges of escallonia, a grape-house and kitchen-garden and a so-called ‘orchard’ beyond". It was in Leslie's words, a place of "intense domestic happiness". For the children it was the highlight of their year, Virginia Woolf later described a summer day in August 1890 in her diary (22 March 1921) with the cries of the children playing in the garden and the sound of the sea beyond, concluding that her life was "built on that, permeated by that: how much so I could never explain". The family did not return following Julia's death in May 1895.

In both London and Cornwall, Julia was perpetually entertaining, and was notorious for her manipulation of her guests' lives, constantly matchmaking in the belief everyone should be married, the domestic equivalence of her philanthropy. As her husband observed "My Julia was of course, though with all due reserve, a bit of a matchmaker". While Cornwall was supposed to be a summer respite, Julia Stephen soon immersed herself in the work of caring for the sick and poor there, as well as in London. (Note: A notice was posted to the effect that the St Ives Nursing Association had hired "a trained nurse ... under the direction of a Committee of Ladies to attend upon the SICK POOR of St Ives free of cost and irrespective of Creed" and that "gifts of old linen" should be sent to Mrs E Hain or Mrs Leslie Stephen, of Talland House and Hyde Park Gate. St Ives, Weekly Summary, Visitors' List and Advertiser 2 September 1893. The phrase "irrespective of Creed" echoes her axiom "Pity has no creed" in Agnostic Women 1880 (see Quotations))

Both at Hyde Park Gate and Talland House, the family mingled with much of the country's literary and artistic circles. Frequent guests included literary figures such as Henry James and George Meredith, as well as James Russell Lowell, and the children were exposed to much more intellectual conversations than their mother's at Little Holland House.

Julia and Leslie Stephen had four children;

- Vanessa "Nessa" (30 May 1879 – 1961), married Clive Bell
- Thoby (9 September 1880 – 1906), founded Bloomsbury Group
- Virginia "Jinny", "Ginia" (25 January 1882 – 1941), married Leonard Woolf
- Adrian (27 October 1883 – 1948), married Karin Costelloe
The Stephen Family

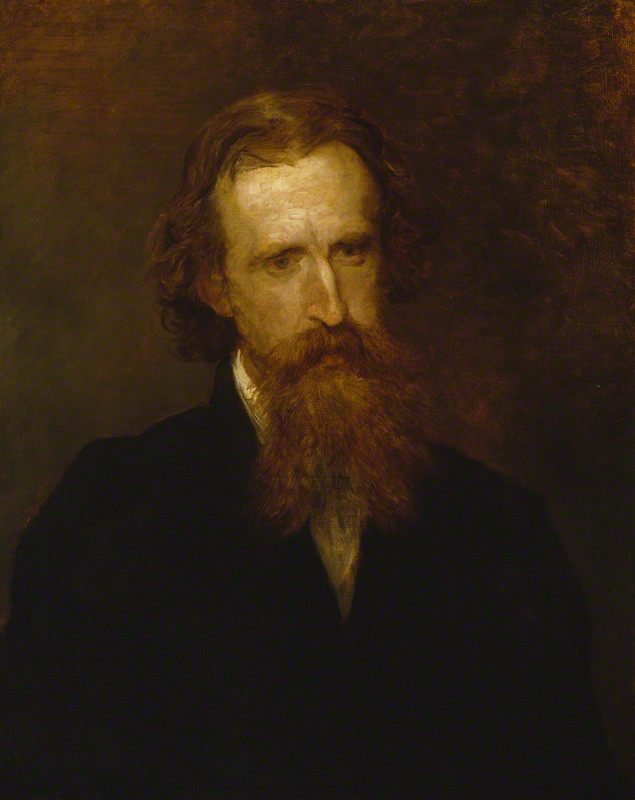
1. Leslie Stephen 1878

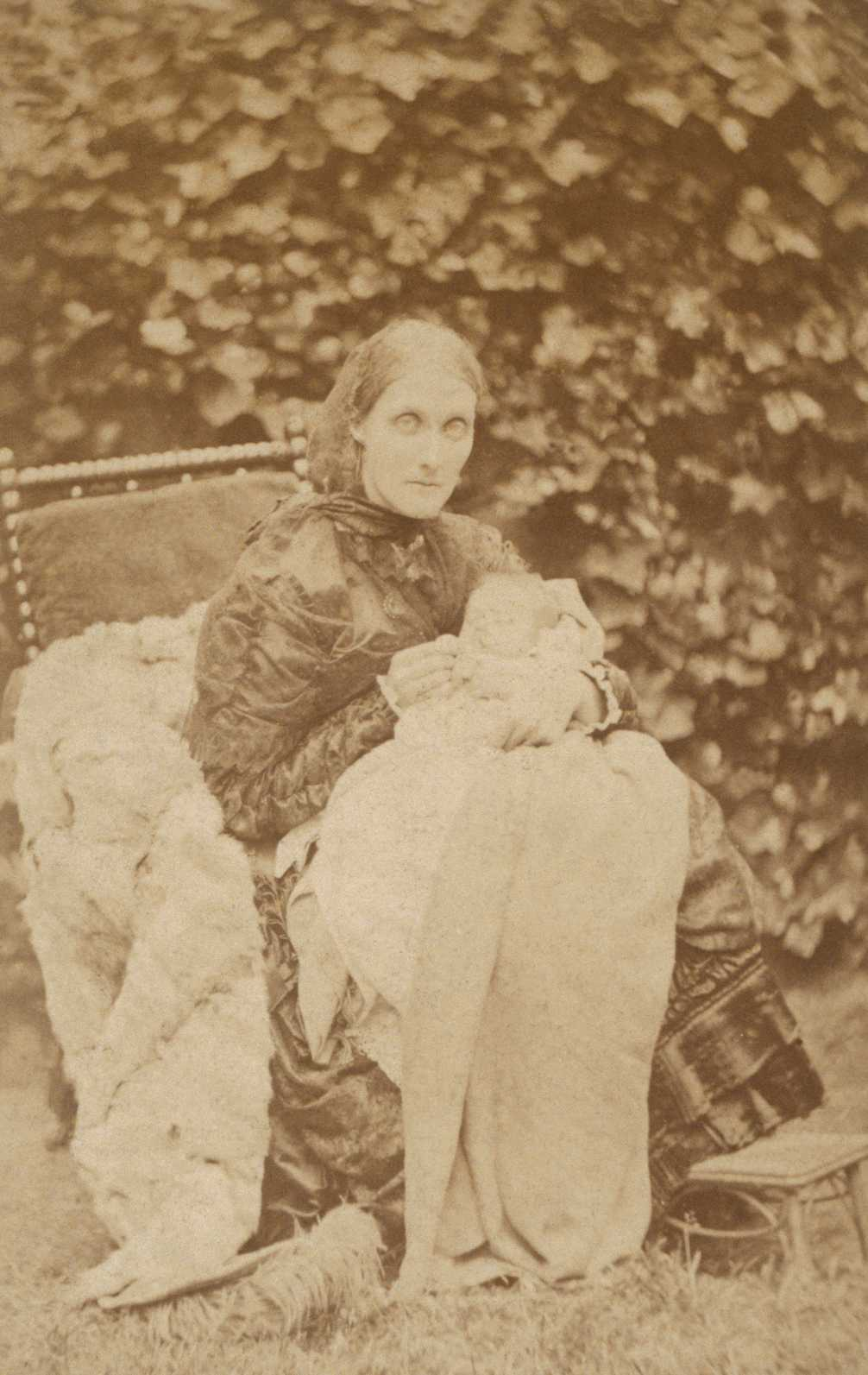
2. Julia with Vanessa 1879

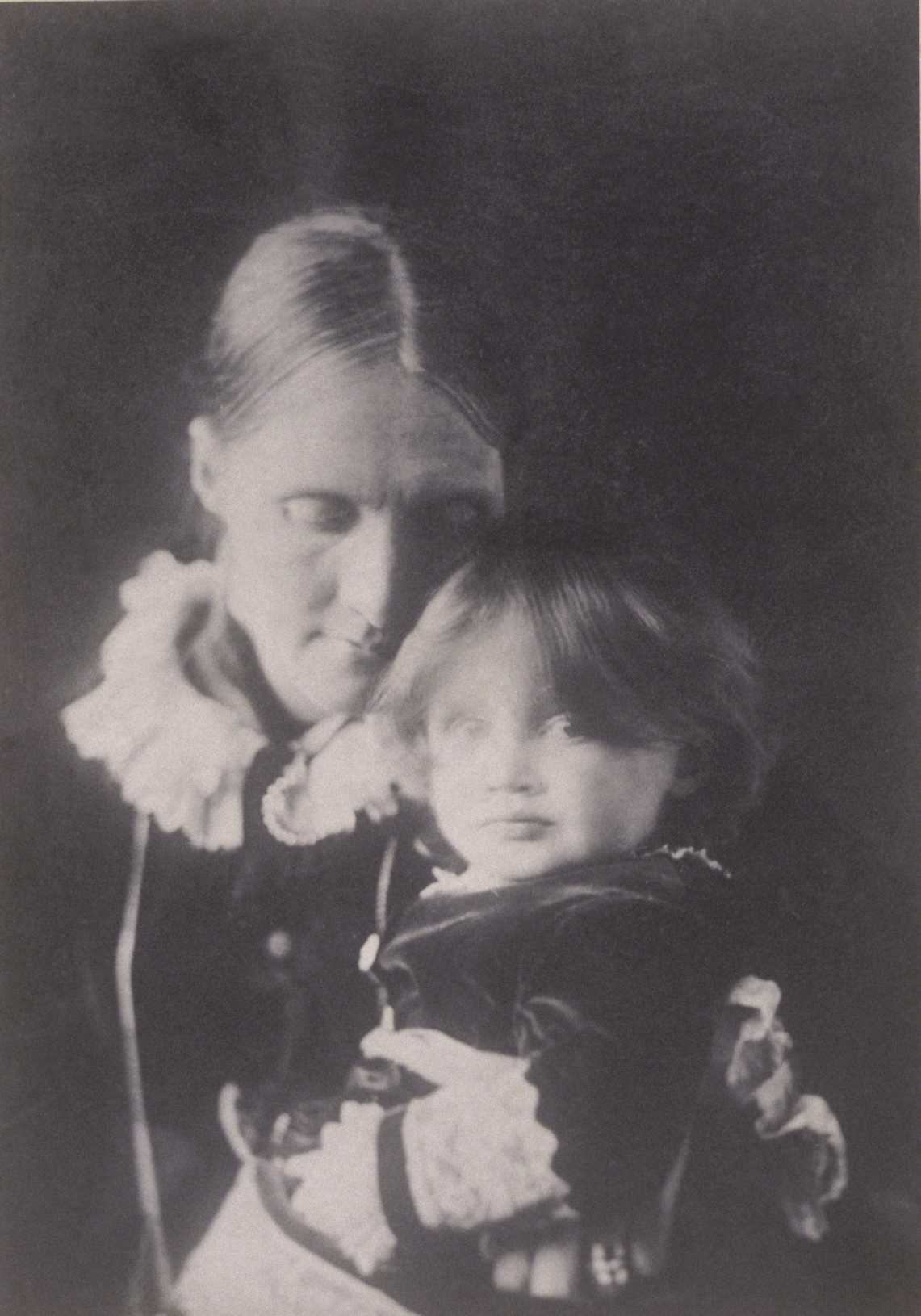
Julia and Virginia 1884

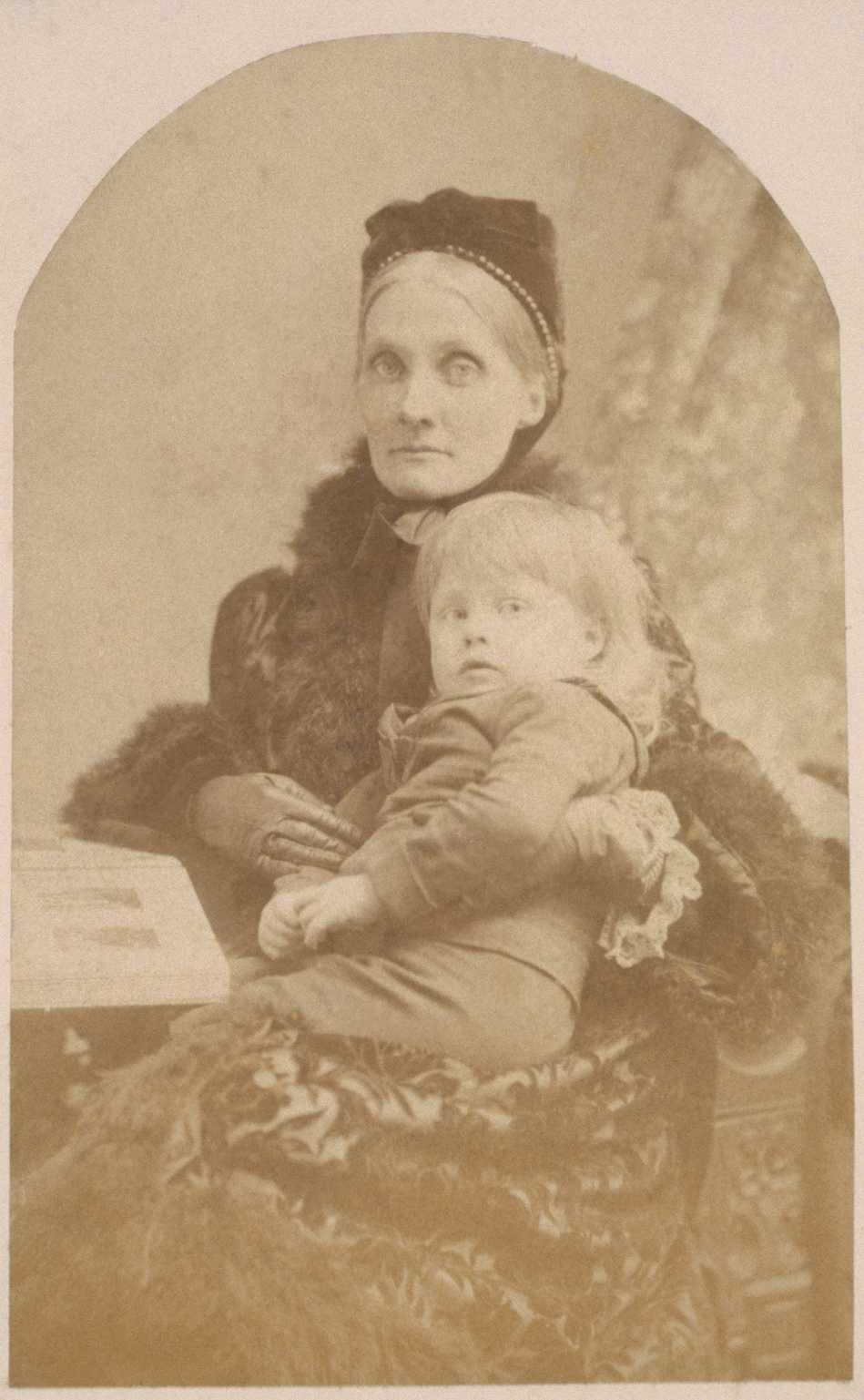
4. Julia with Adrian c. 1886

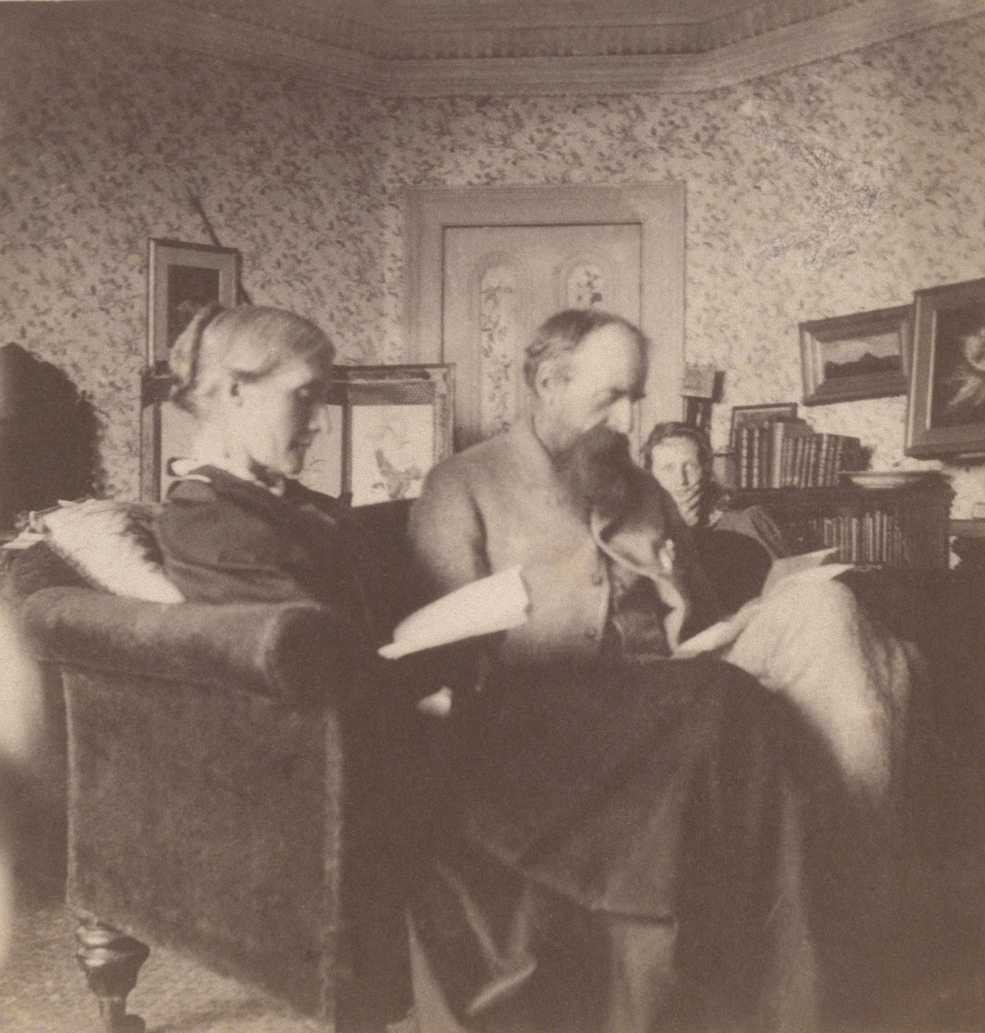
5. Julia, Leslie and Virginia, Talland House 1892

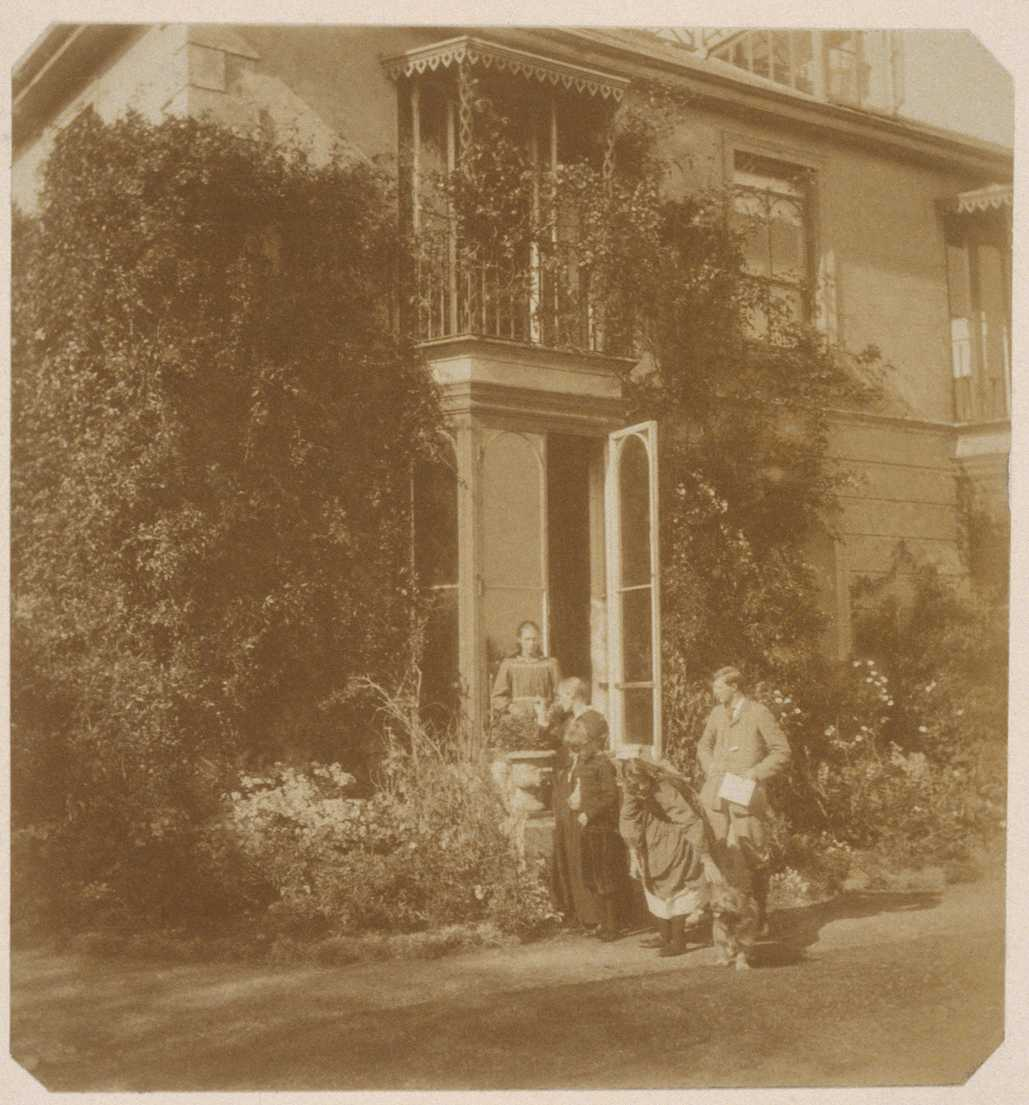
6. Vanessa, Julia, Virginia and Thoby outside Talland House, Summer 1894

1. Portrait of Leslie Stephen painted by George Frederic Watts and presented to Julia as a wedding present
4. Photograph by Vanessa Bell, in the library; (Note: Leslie Stephen incorrectly dated it 1893 in his album. In describing it, he wrote "when I look at certain little photographs - at one on which I am reading by her side at St Ives with Virginia ... I see as with my bodily eyes the love, the holy and tender love") 5. Julia died in May 1895. This would be the family's last summer in St Ives

=== Relationships with family and household ===
Much of what is known about Julia Stephen comes from the viewpoint of her husband, Leslie Stephen, and her daughter, Virginia Woolf, although the latter had only just turned thirteen when her mother died. Woolf, who stated that "for we think back through our mothers if we are women", invoked the image of her mother repeatedly throughout her life in her diary, her letters and a number of her autobiographical essays, including Reminiscences (1908), 22 Hyde Park Gate (1921) and A Sketch of the Past (1940), frequently evoking her memories with the words "I see her ...". She also alludes to her childhood in her fictional writing. In To The Lighthouse (1927) the artist, Lily Briscoe, attempts to paint Mrs Ramsay, a complex character based on Julia Stephen, and repeatedly comments on the fact that she was "astonishingly beautiful". Her depiction of the life of the Ramsays in the Hebrides is an only thinly disguised account of the Stephens in Cornwall and the Godrevy Lighthouse they would visit there. But Woolf's understanding of her mother and family evolved considerably between 1907 and 1940, in which the somewhat distant, yet revered figure becomes more nuanced and filled in. While Vanessa was slightly older at fifteen when her mother died, her recollections are provided in her daughter, Angelica Garnett's memoir.

As the youngest daughter, and last to marry, Julia was her mother's favourite daughter, in part due to her constant care of her mother who had many needs, and little time for maternal affection. With the premature death in 1881 of Maria Jackson's eldest daughter Adeline at 44, followed by that of her husband in 1887, she became increasingly hypochondriacal and an increasing demand on Julia's resources necessitated her making frequent visits to Sussex (Note: Mrs Jackson spent her final years in Brighton) as well as caring for her mother in her Hyde Park Gate Home, where she died on 2 April 1892. By contrast, Leslie Stephen observed that her father was an unobtrusive presence and "somehow he did not seem to count".

Leslie Stephen writes about Julia "the noblest woman present" in tones of reverence in his Mausoleum Book, written for the children after her death. In that he was reminded of what was written about the Carlyles, and like Thomas Carlyle embarked on memorialising his wife. (Note: After Julia's death in 1895, Leslie Stephen compiled an epistolary memoir and photograph album for the children. The memoir (Mausoleum Book) remained known only to the family till published in 1977. Begun on 21 May 16 days after Julia's death and completed in six weeks, it was composed as a letter to her children with a request to keep the contents confidential. To it was appended a calendar of Julia's correspondence. The photograph album is available, in part, on line) It was evident that he (and he was not alone in this) regarded her as a "beloved angel" and a saint, indeed as an agnostic, he had already sanctified her prior to their marriage, informing her that she replaced the Blessed Virgin. He describes her appearance as one in which her "beauty was of a kind which seems to imply—as most certainly did accompany—equal beauty of soul, refinement nobility, and tenderness of character". It is evident that she lived a life devoted both to her family and to the needs of others. Woolf drew a sharp distinction between her mother's work and "the mischievous philanthropy which other women practise so complacently and often with such disastrous results". She describes her degree of sympathy, engagement, judgement and decisiveness, and her sense of both irony and the absurd. She recalls trying to recapture "the clear round voice, or the sight of the beautiful figure, so upright and distinct, in its long shabby cloak, with the head held at a certain angle, so that the eye looked straight out at you". Julia's many domestic duties included sharing the education of the children with her husband. The girls were educated to a degree at home, while the boys were sent to private boys' boarding schools (known as public schools in the UK) and then university, as was the custom of the time. There was a small classroom off the back of the drawing room, with its many windows, which they found perfect for quiet writing and painting. Julia taught the children Latin, French and History, while Leslie taught them mathematics. They also received piano lessons.

Children

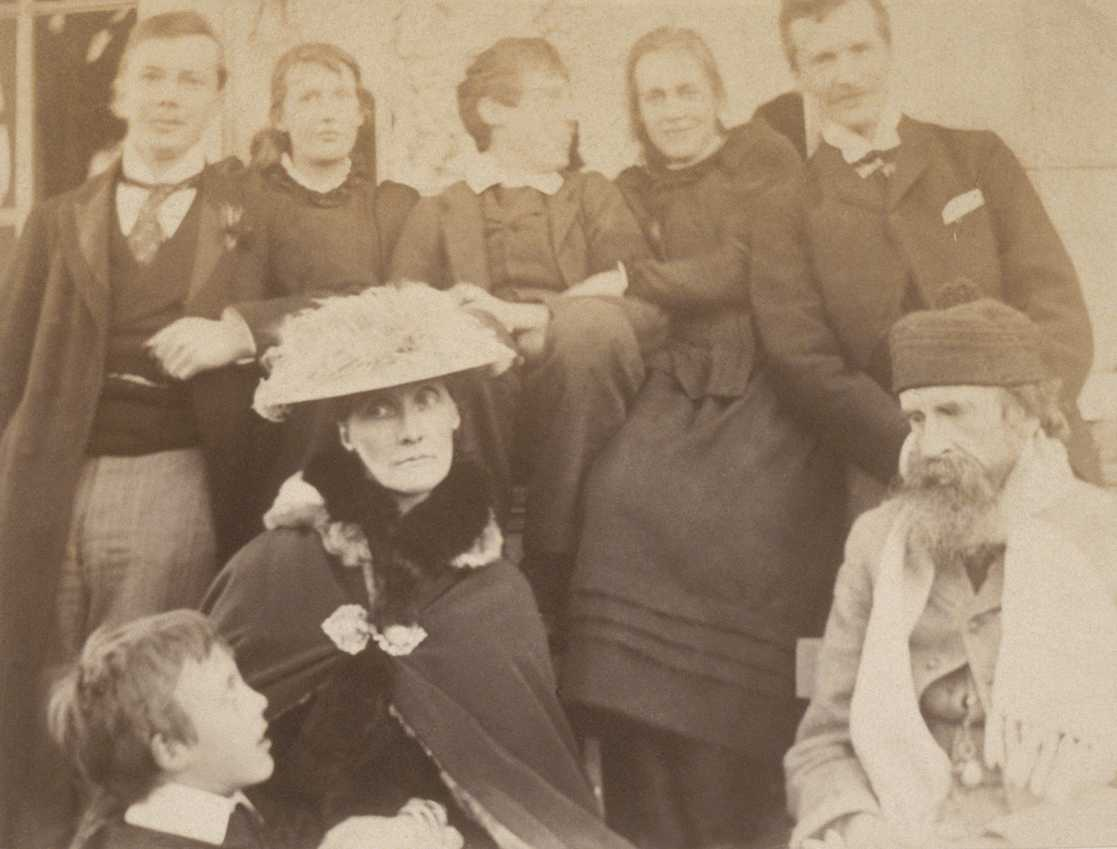
Julia and Leslie Stephen with her children (Stella absent, Adrian front row), 1892

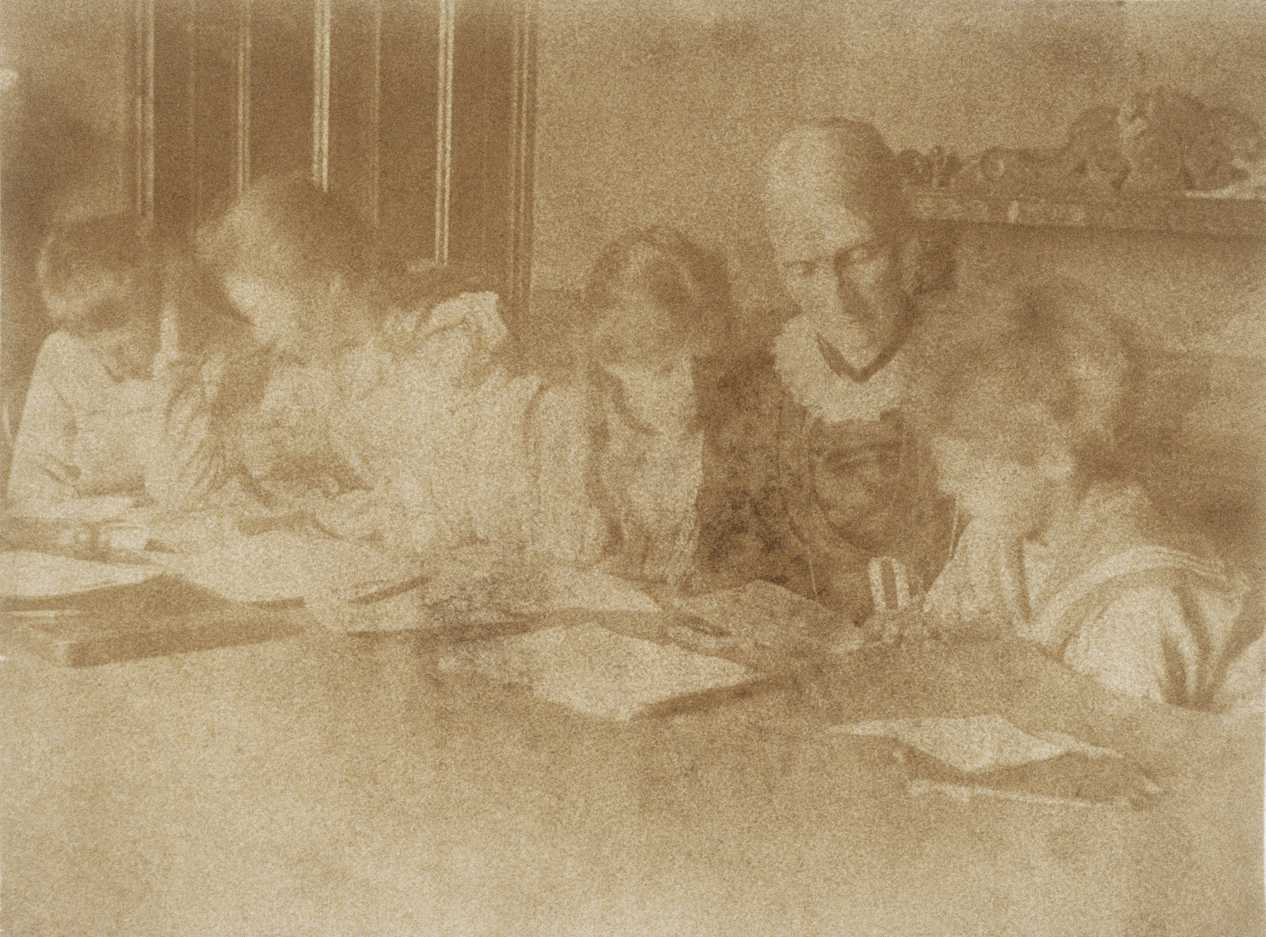
Stephen children with Julia at lessons, Talland House c. 1894

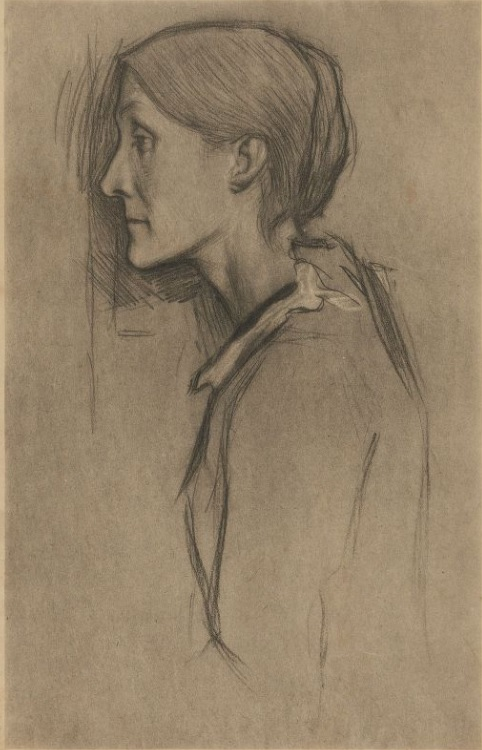
Julia Stephen 1890, drawing by William Rothenstein

Julia dealt with her husband's depressive moods and his need for attention, which created resentment in her children, boosted his self-confidence, nursed her parents in their final illness, and had many commitments outside the home that would eventually wear her down. Her frequent absences and the demands of her husband instilled a sense of insecurity in her children that had a lasting effect on her daughters. Amongst her family commitments, she cared for her mother during her long period of ill health, nursed her uncle Henry Prinsep when he was dying in 1878, and her sister Adeline who died in 1881. Leslie Stephen was also prone to bouts of ill health, suffering a breakdown from overwork in 1888–1889. Leslie Stephen describes how his constant self-deprecation, was intended to elicit Julia's sympathy and attention. In considering the demands on her mother, Woolf described her father as "fifteen years her elder, difficult, exacting, dependent on her" and reflected that this was at the expense of the amount of attention she could spare her young children, "a general presence rather than a particular person to a child", reflecting that she rarely ever spent a moment alone with her mother, "someone was always interrupting". Woolf was ambivalent about all this, yet eager to separate herself from this model of utter selflessness. She describes it as "boasting of her capacity to surround and protect, there was scarcely a shell of herself left for her to know herself by" At the same time she admired the strengths of her mother's womanly ideals. Given Julia's frequent absences and commitments, the young Stephen children became increasingly dependent on Stella Duckworth, who emulated her mother's selflessness, as Woolf wrote "Stella was always the beautiful attendant handmaid ... making it the central duty of her life". At the same time, Julia's relationship with Stella, who idolised her, was frequently problematic. As Julia confided to her husband, she was especially hard on her eldest daughter because she considered her part of herself.

Julia greatly admired her husband's intellect, and although she knew her own mind, thought little of her own. As Woolf observed "she never belittled her own works, thinking them, if properly discharged, of equal, though other, importance with her husband's". She believed with certainty in her role as the centre of her activities, and the person who held everything together, with a firm sense of what was important and valuing devotion. Of the two parents, Julia's "nervous energy dominated the family". While Virginia identified most closely with her father, Vanessa stated her mother was her favourite parent. Angelica Garnett recalls how Virginia asked Vanessa which parent she preferred, although Vanessa considered it a question that "one ought not to ask", she was unequivocal in answering "Mother" Stella, the oldest daughter, led a life of total subservience to her mother, incorporating her ideals of love and service. Virginia quickly learned, that like her father, being ill was the only reliable way of gaining the attention of her mother, who prided herself on her sickroom nursing. Against this background of over committed and distant parents, suggestions that this was a dysfunctional family must be evaluated. These include evidence of sexual abuse of the Stephen girls by their older Duckworth half brothers, and by their cousin, James Kenneth Stephen (1859–1892), at least of Stella. (Note: James Kenneth Stephen was the son of James Fitzjames Stephen, Leslie Stephen's older brother) Laura is also thought to have been abused. The most graphic account is by Louise DeSalvo, but other authors and reviewers have been more cautious. Other issues the children had to deal with was Leslie Stephen's temper, Woolf describing him as "the tyrant father".

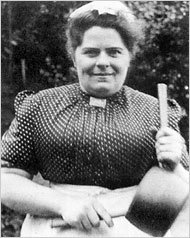
Sophie Farrell 1890

Julia's grandson, Quentin Bell (1910–1996) describes her as saintly, with a certain gravitas derived from sorrow, playful and tender with her children, sympathetic to the poor and sick or otherwise afflicted, and always called upon at times of need as a ministering angel. As he adds, "because of this one cannot quite believe in her". Yet a close reading of Leslie Stephen's memoir reveals cracks in the image of the perfection of both Julia and the marriage. Woolf's more balanced assessment seems more realistic than her father's idealised version, but her family's assessments also need to be balanced by the picture that emerges from Julia's own writings. In contrast, Vanessa maintained her idealised version of her mother, passing it on to her own daughter. Ultimately the demands on her selflessness and her tireless efforts on behalf of others became too much and started to take their toll. Like her husband (and eventually her daughters), she suffered from depression, and has been described as "haunted, worn down and beautiful" as captured, somewhat controversially, by Rothenstein's drawings of her in the 1890s, shown here. Woolf, like all the family, greatly admired her mother's beauty, and so strong was her conviction she could not accept what Rothenstein depicted, "my mother was more beautiful than you show her".

Running a large household, in a towering Victorian mansion and with many commitments outside the home necessitated the supervision of the family finances and management of a large number of domestic servants, as would be common then, and indeed indispensable in such a lifestyle. This would be the subject of two of her essays. So strong were some of these ties, that Sophie Farrell, who came to work at 22 Hyde Park Gate in 1886, would continue to work for various members of the extended Stephen family for the rest of her life. Woolf provides us with a picture of her mother "adding up the weekly books". Nevertheless, it was a household run by a woman for a man, Julia believing that a woman's role was ultimately to serve her husband.

=== Death ===
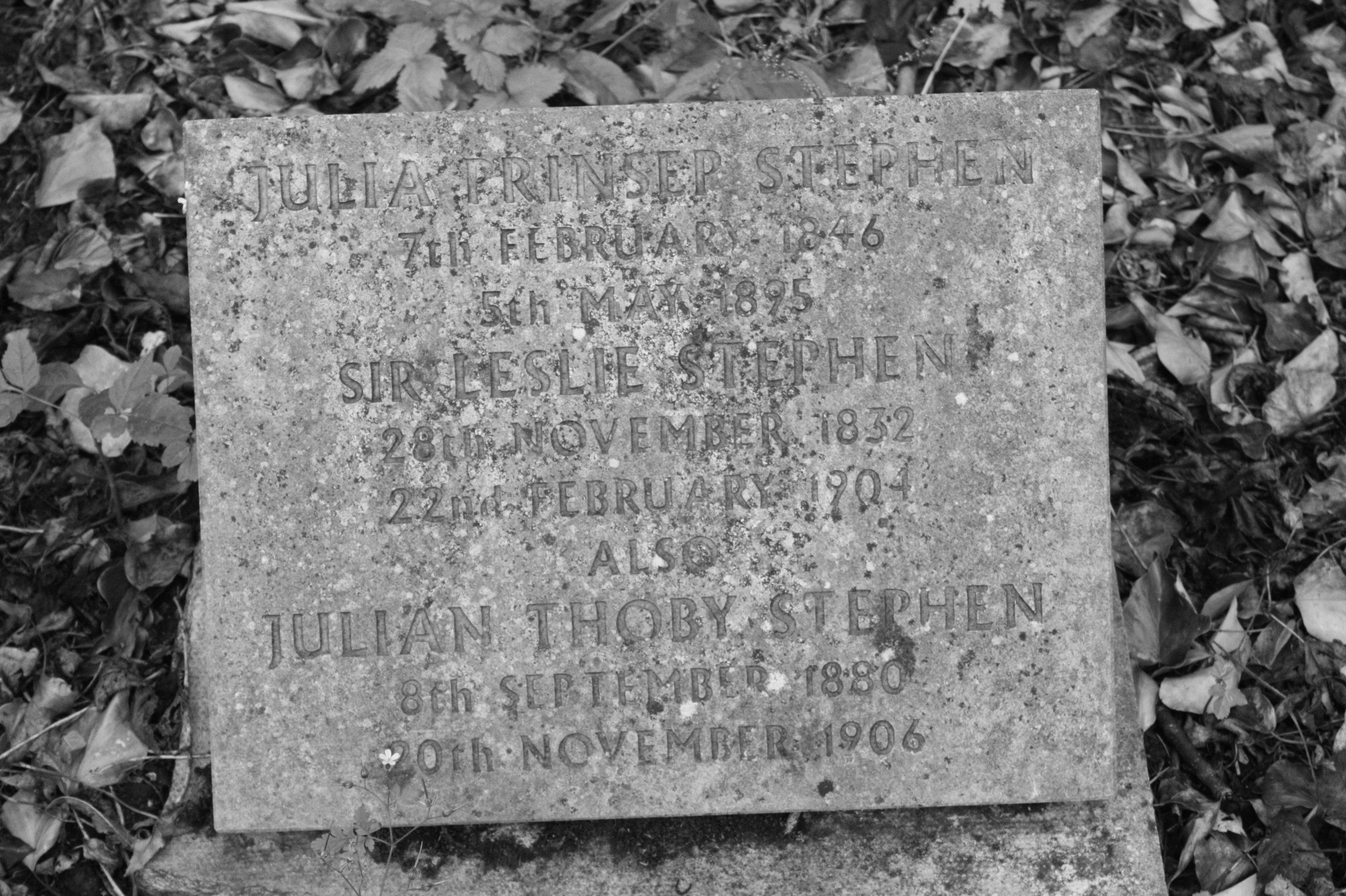
Julia Stephen's Grave, Highgate Cemetery

On 5 May 1895, Julia died at her home, of heart failure brought on by influenza at the age of 49. She left her husband with four young children aged 11 to 15 (her children by her first marriage being adults, although Stella, then 26, took over her mother's duties till she was married two years later). Julia was buried on 8 May at Highgate Cemetery, where her husband, daughter Stella and son Thoby were also later interred. Julia's wealth at her death is listed as £5483 17s 1d. (Note: Stephen Julia Prinsep of 22 Hyde-park-gate South Kensington Middlesex (wife of Leslie Stephen) died 5 May 1895 Probate London. 26 July to the said Leslie Stephen gentleman Effects £5483 17s 1d)

== Work ==
=== Artist's model ===
Julia Stephen is best known for being a model, not only of Pre-Raphaelite painters, but also her photographer aunt, Julia Margaret Cameron. She was Julia Margaret Cameron's favourite and most trusted and mutable model, (see Gallery II) documenting her moods and meditations. Cameron was fascinated to a degree of obsession by Julia, with over 50 portraits, (Note: Plates 279–321 and 328–333 in Cox & Ford 2003) more than any other subject. Julia's legacy is the image Cameron portrayed in her earlier days, the fragile ethereal figure with large soulful eyes and long wild hair. Most of Cameron's photographs of Julia were taken between 1864 and 1875, including a series of profiles in the spring of 1867, two of which were during her period of engagement (plates 310–311), in which Cameron portrayed Julia's cool puritan beauty as a metaphor for the symbolic place of marriage, that Cameron called "the real nobility I prize above all things". Here Cameron frames the bust with emphatic side lighting that accentuates the tautness in the swanlike neck and the strength in the head, indicating heroism and stateliness as befits a girl on the verge of matrimony. By placing the subject facing into the light, the photographer illuminates her and suggests a forthcoming enlightenment.

Cameron frequently used a soft focus such as Julia Duckworth 1867 (plate 311) here. (Note: Roger Fry wrote that this portrait was "a splendid success. The transitions of tone in the cheek and the delicate suggestions of reflected light, no less than the beautiful ‘drawing’ of the profile, are perfectly satisfying”) One of these portraits she titled My Favorite Picture of all my works. In this her eyes, are downcast and averted from the lens, a more sentimental effect than the dramatic frontal view of My niece Julia full face shown here. In this portrait, the subject appears to stare assertively at the photographer, as if saying: "I am, like you, my own woman." These are in sharp contrast to the series taken during her long widowhood and mourning for her first husband (1870–1878), with its gaunt pallid facial features. Again, Cameron draws on another Victorian symbol, this time the tragic heroine whose beauty is consumed in grief.

Gallery I. Julia Stephen in Art

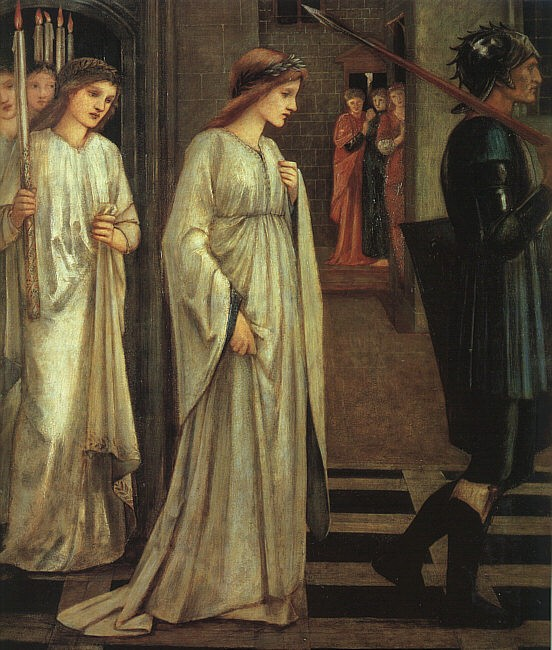
1. The Princess Sabra Led to the Dragon, 1866

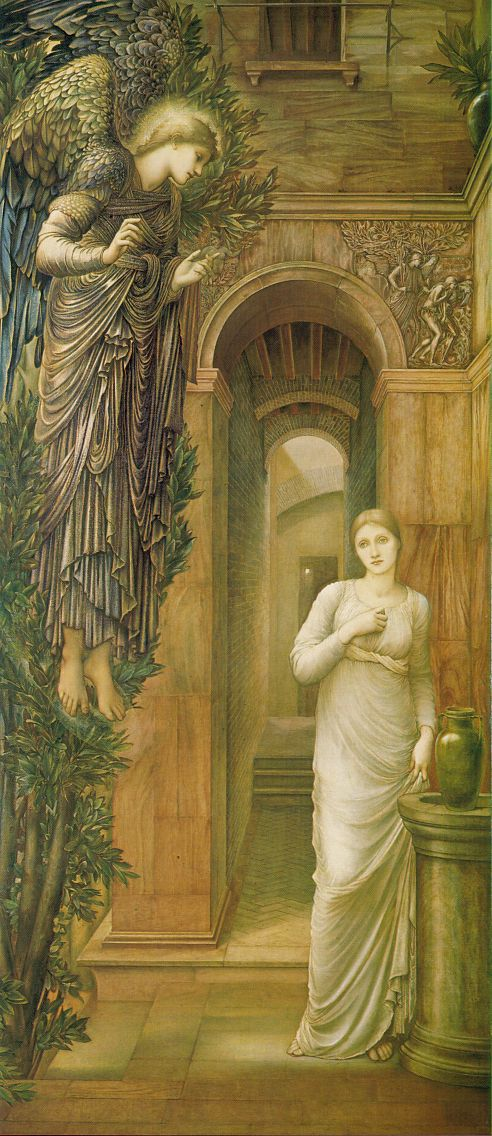
2. The Annunciation, 1879

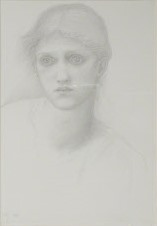
3. Study of Woman's head, 1873

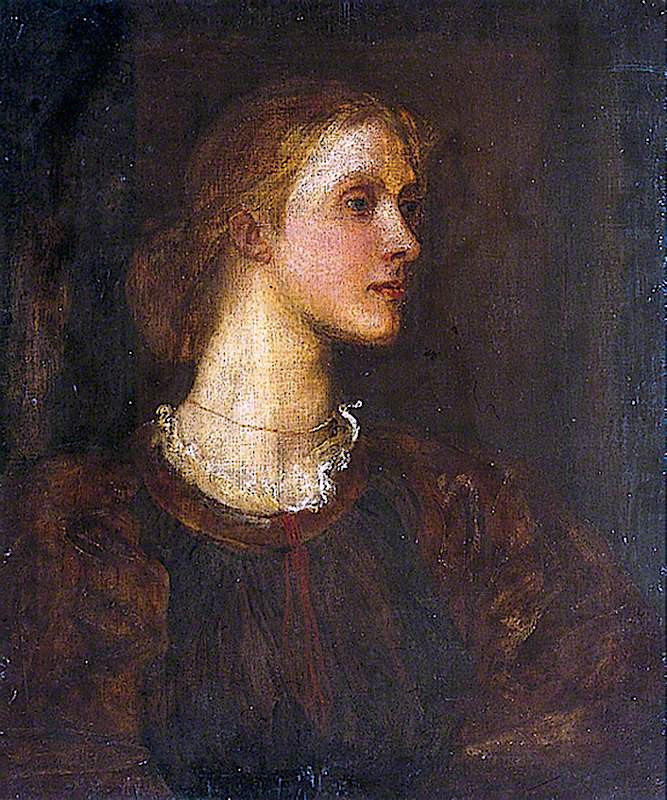
4. Julia Duckworth 1870

1–3 Burne-Jones. 4. George Frederic Watts

Gallery II. Julia Margaret Cameron's photographs of Julia Stephen 1864–1874

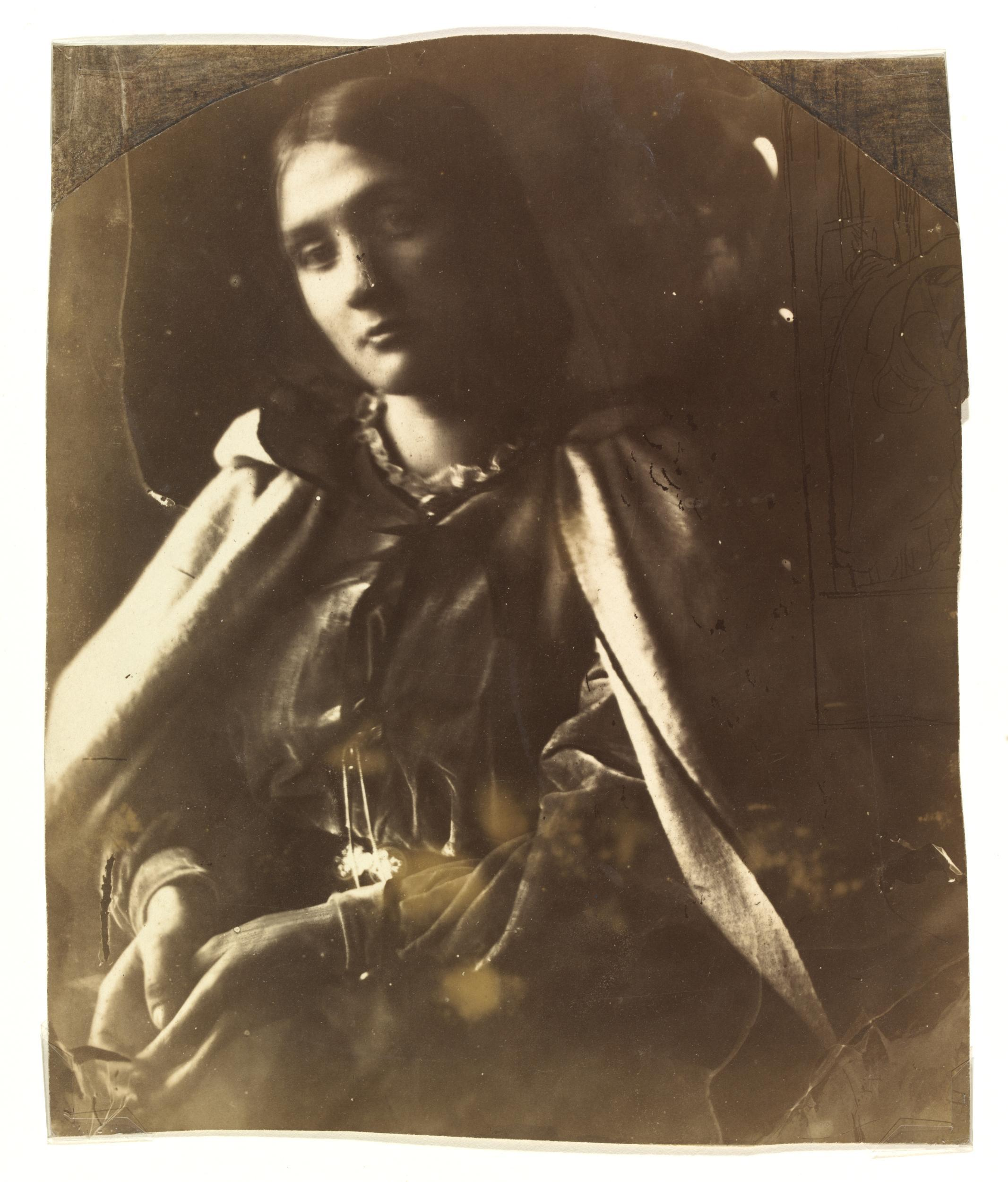
Julia Jackson 1864 [280]

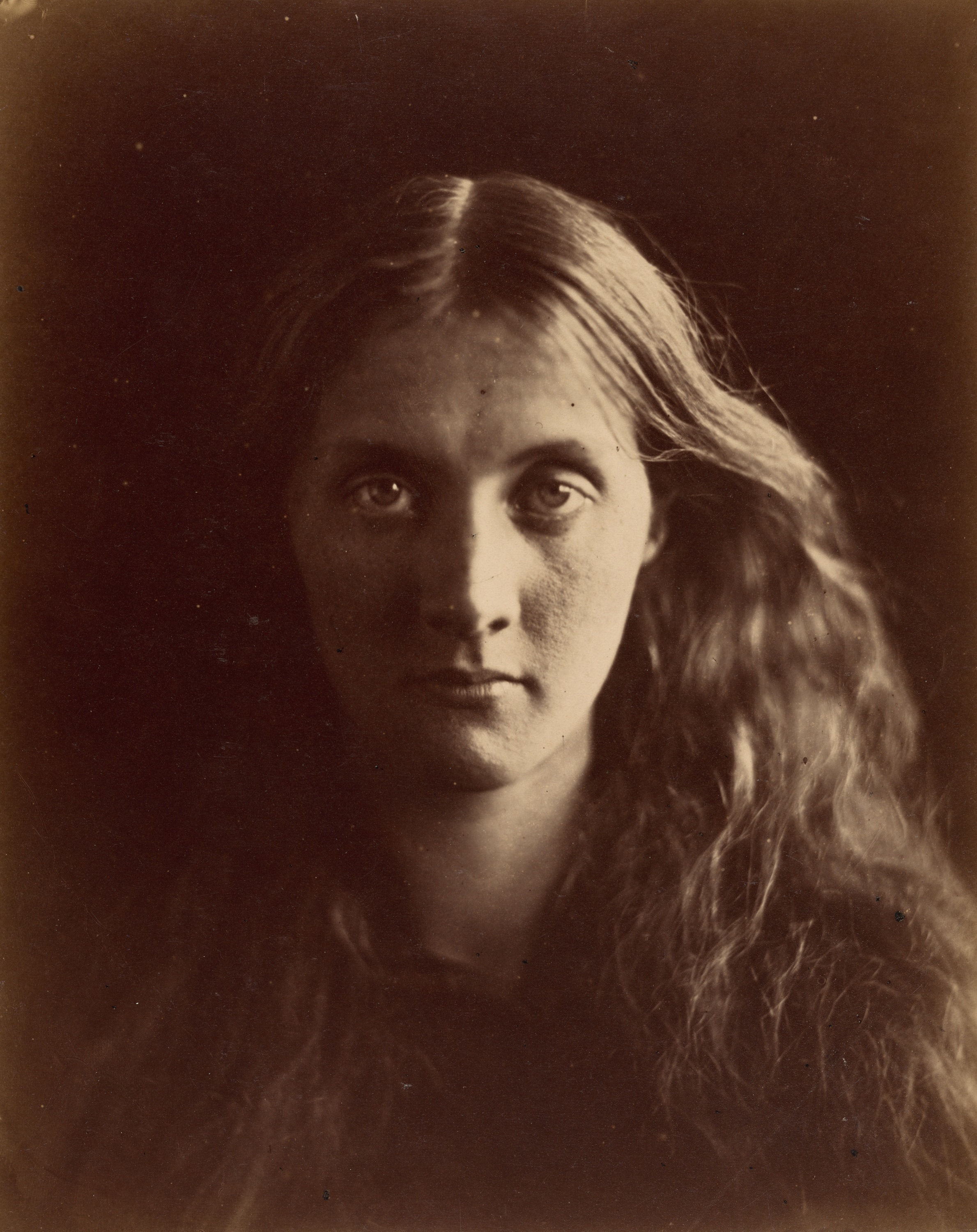
My niece Julia full face, April 1867 [305]

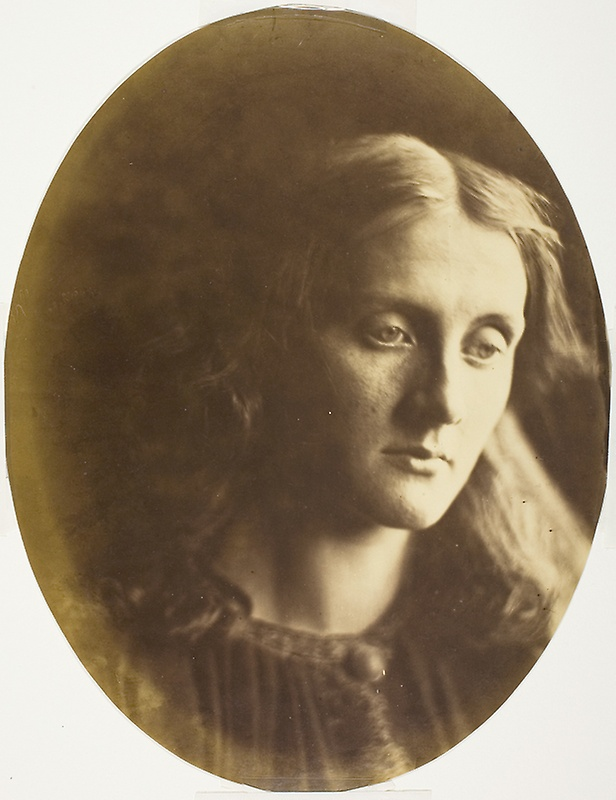
My Favorite Picture of all my works, my niece Julia Jackson, 1867 [302]

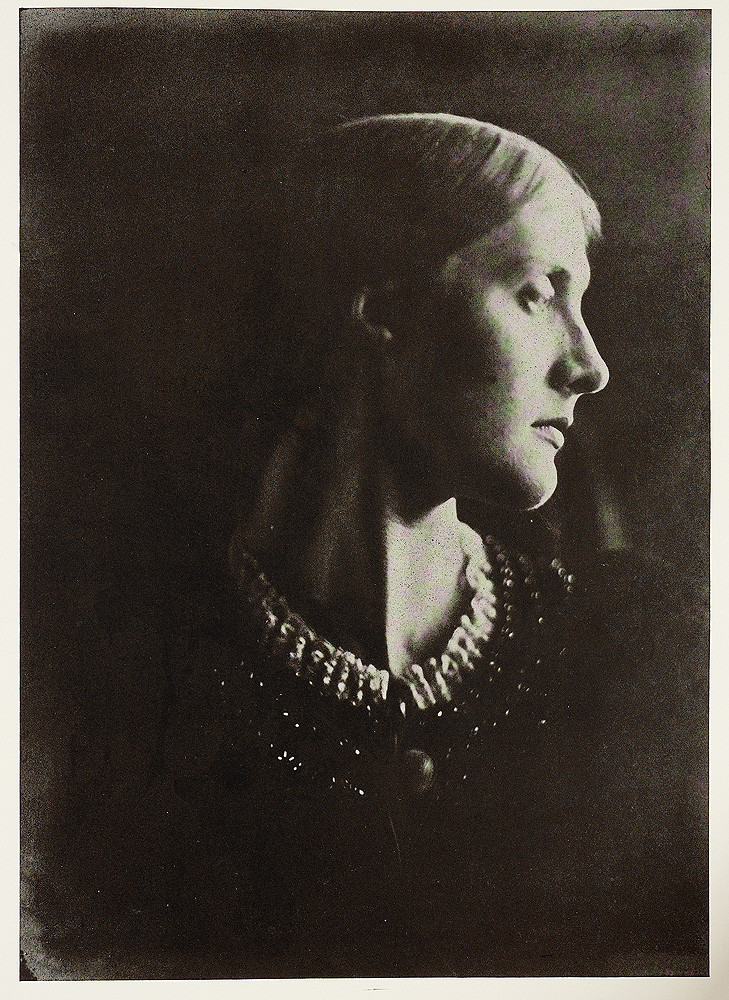
My niece Julia Jackson, now Mrs Herbert Duckworth April 1867 [311] (Note: Often reproduced as an oval, due to its cameo like composition, the image suggests deep relief and the ideals of purity, strength, and grace. The photographer provided detailed notes on the sitting which she described as an "experiment" lit by firelight, and a 4 minute exposure. It fetched an unusually high price for the time of £1)

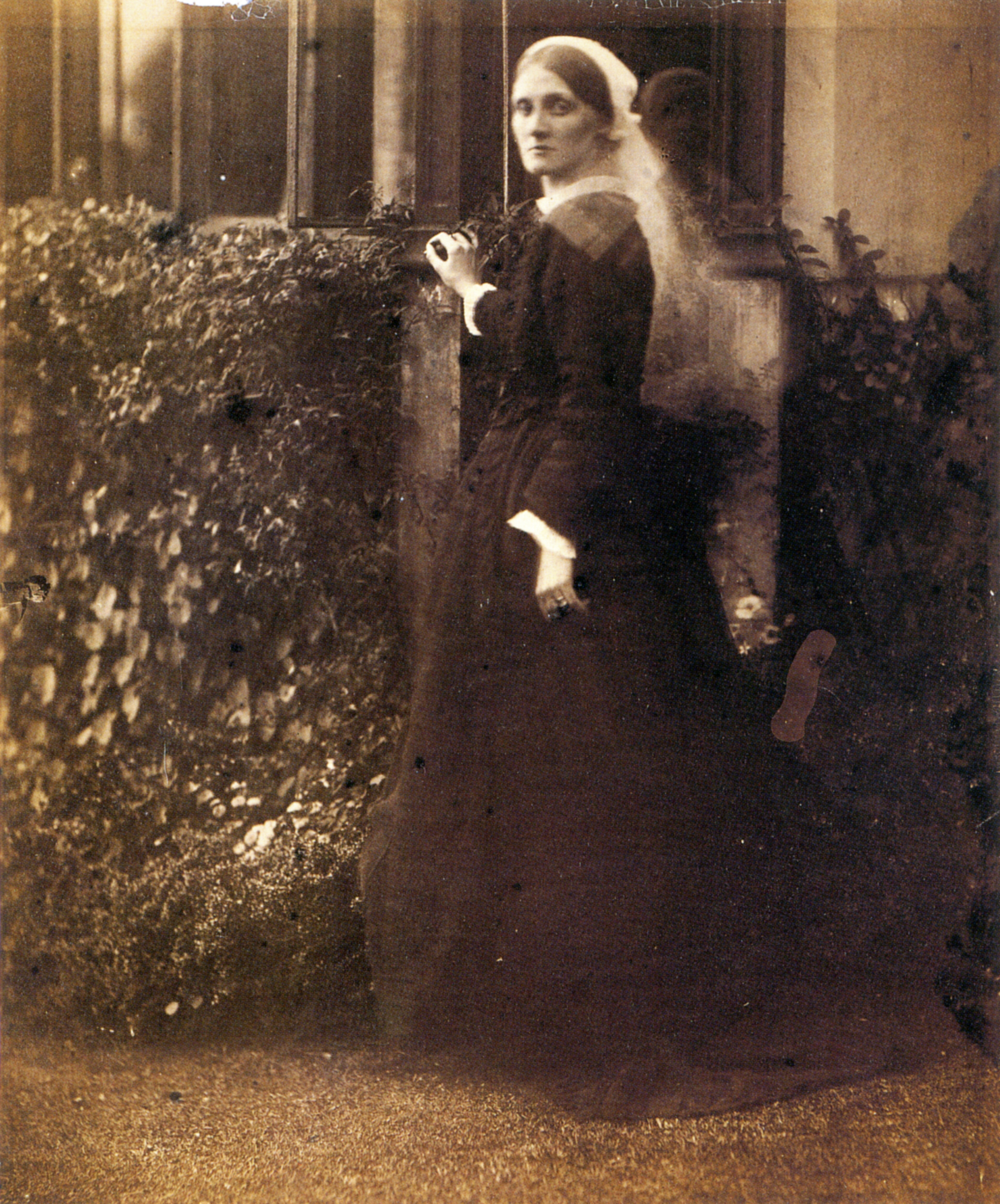
Julia Duckworth in Garden, 1872 [321]

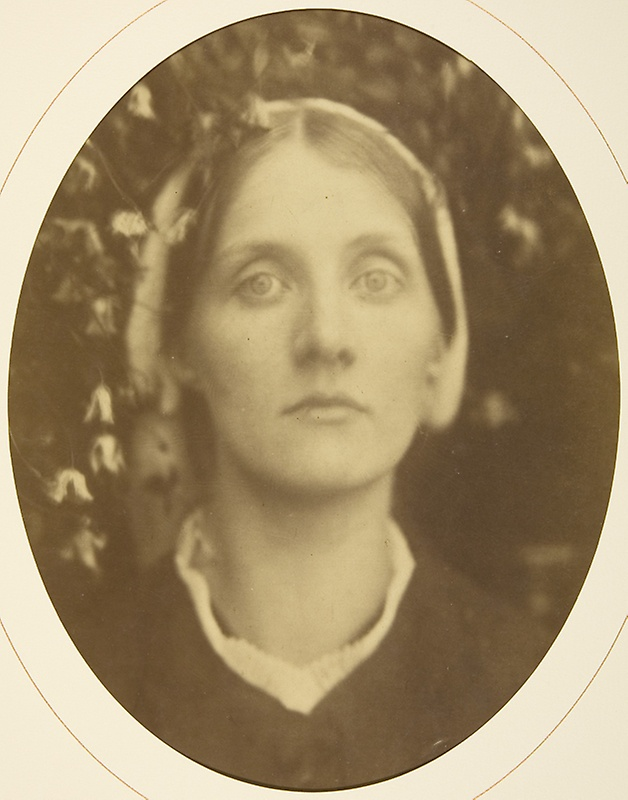
Mrs. Herbert Duckworth, "A Beautiful Vision", 1872 [316]

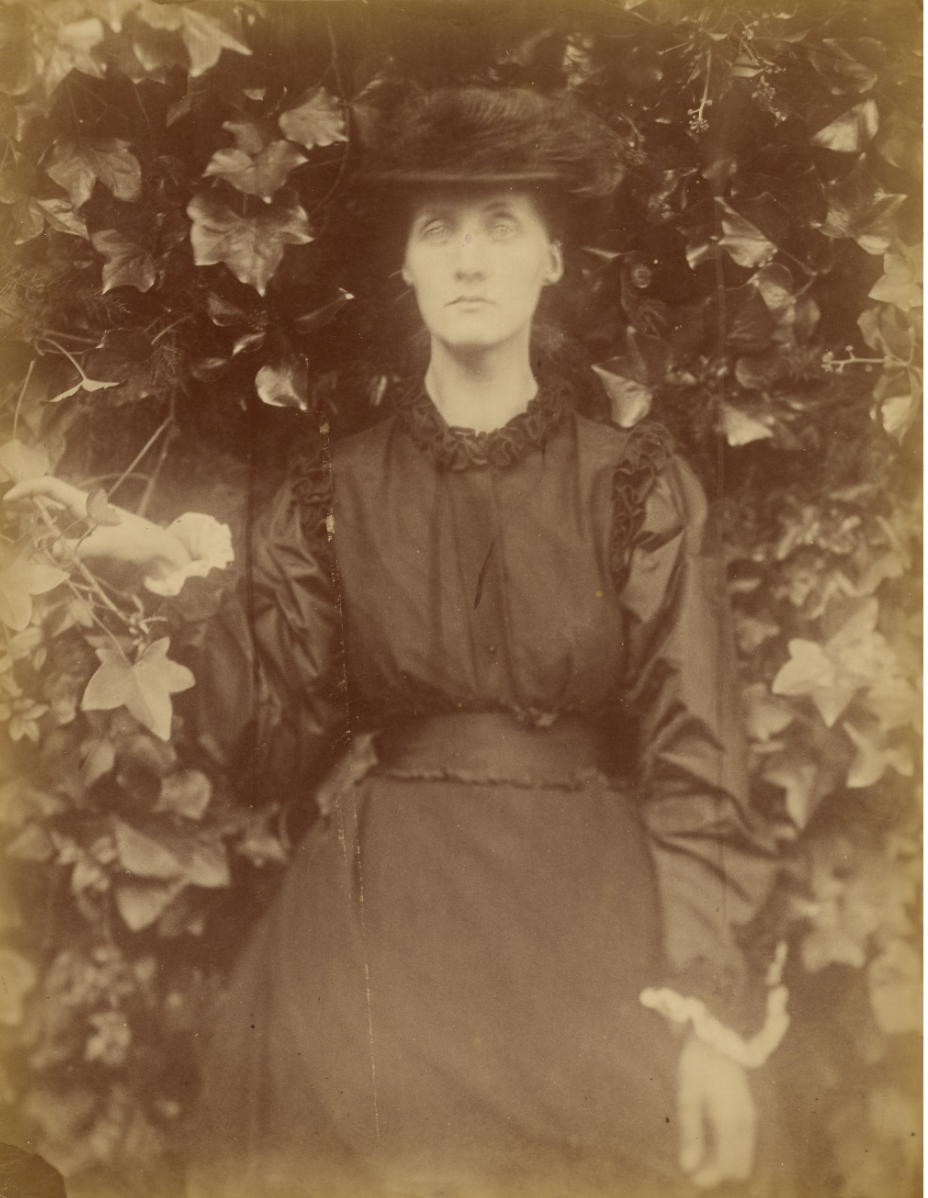
Mrs Herbert Duckworth 1874 [332]

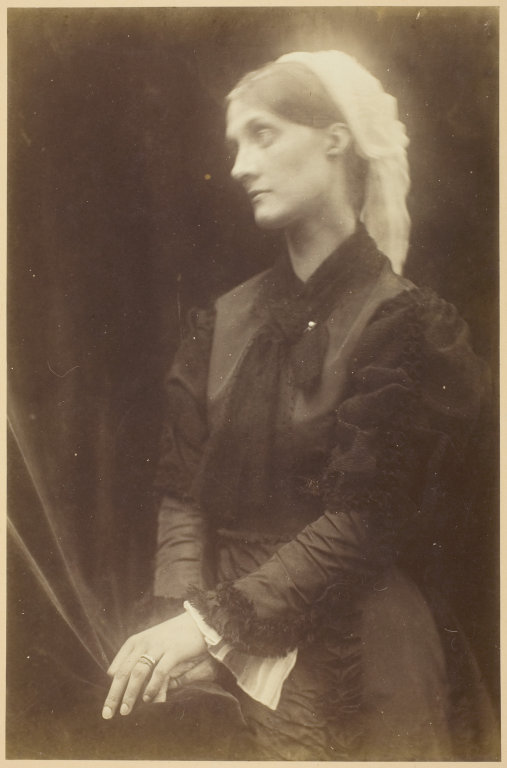
Mrs Herbert Duckworth September 1874 [330]

Upper row: Prior to first marriage (1867). Lower row: Widowhood (1870-)
Numbers refer to plates in Cox & Ford 2003

=== Social activism and philanthropy ===
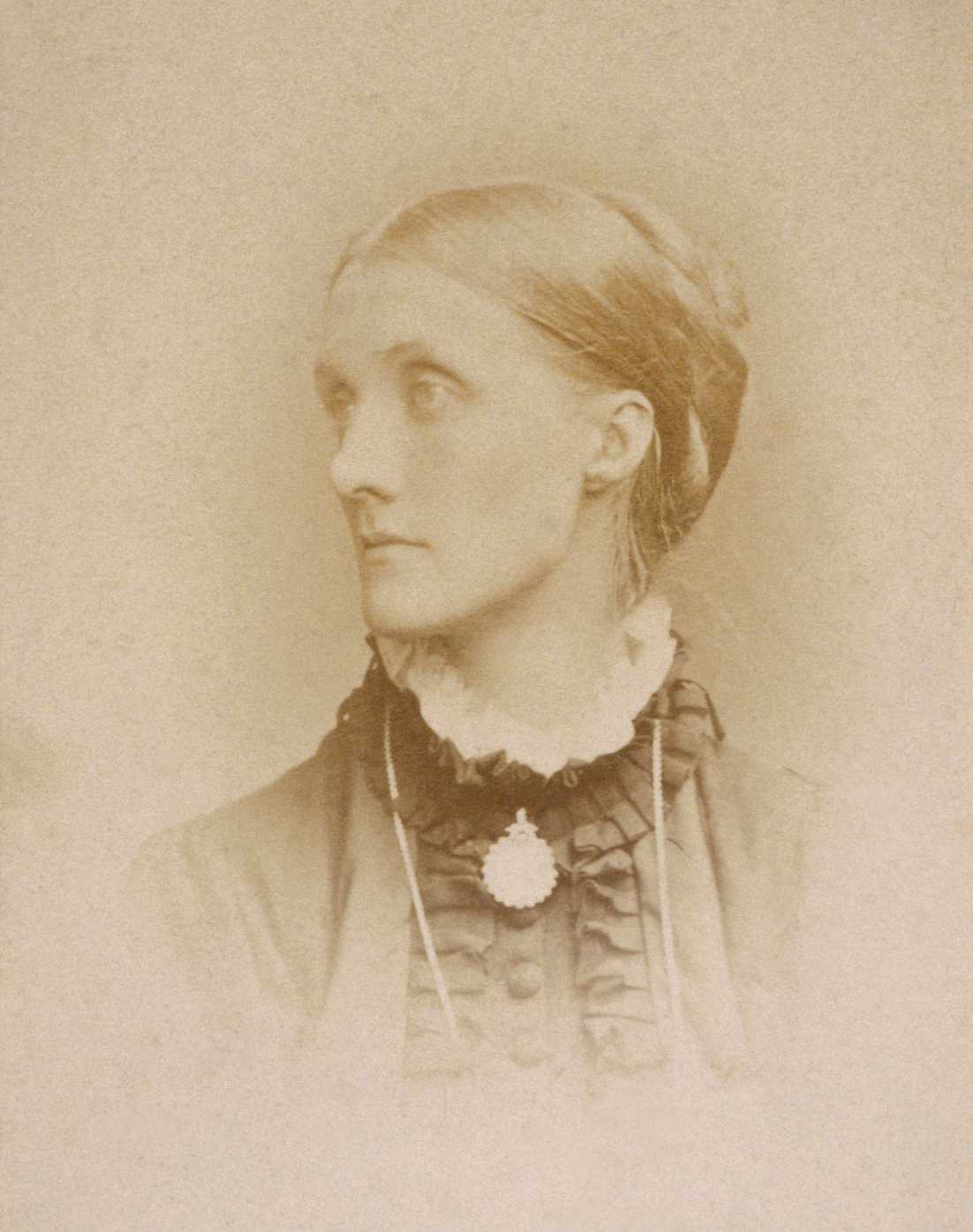
Julia 1880s

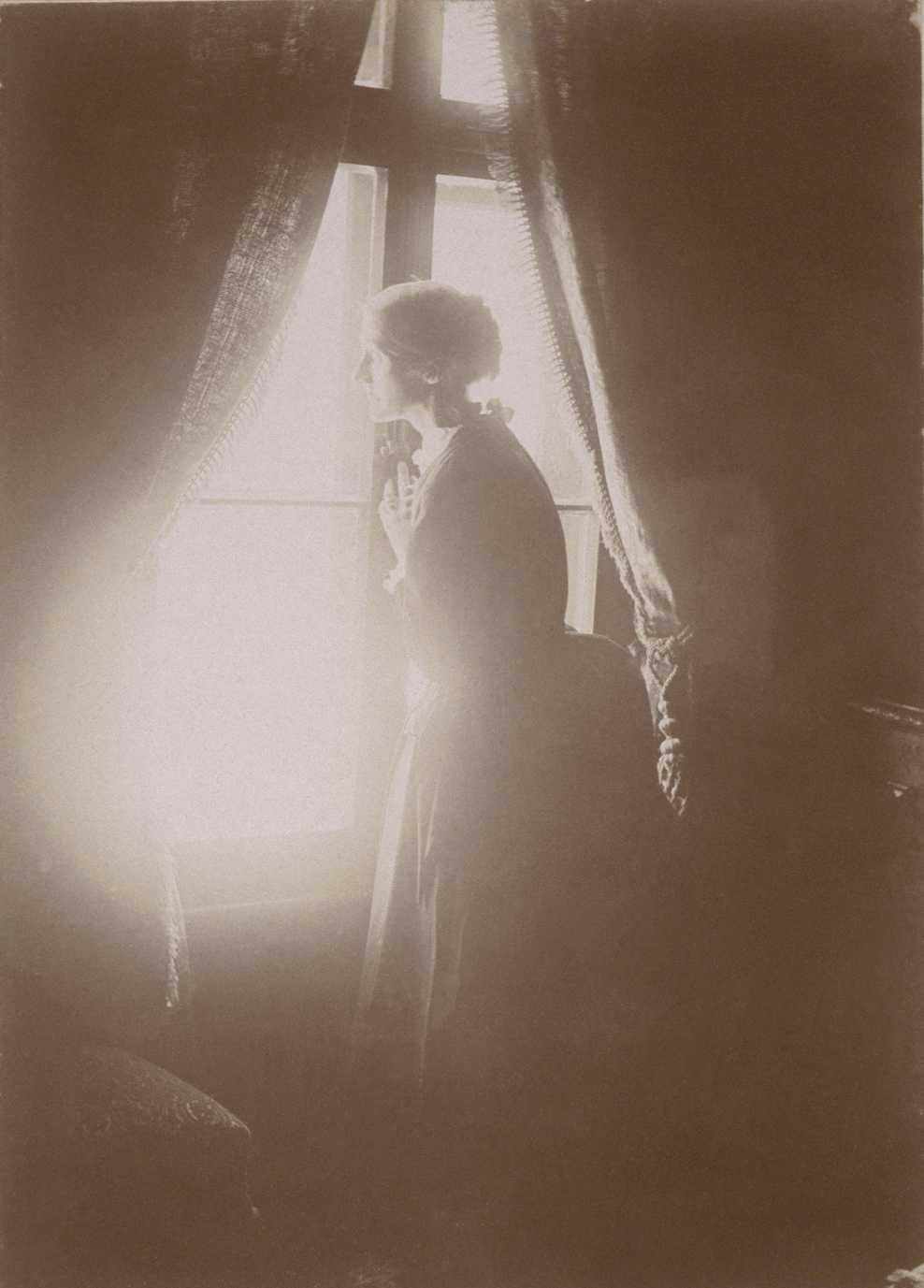
Julia in Switzerland 1889, photographed by Gabriel Loppé (Note: This photograph is thought to be the inspiration for the last scene of Virginia Woolf's On Being Ill (1930).) It stood on the writing-table of her daughter, Vanessa Bell, and that of her daughter, Angelica, in turn

In addition to her tireless contributions to running the Stephen household, and attending to the needs of her relatives, she worked to support friends and supplicants. She had a strong sense of social justice, travelling around London by bus, nursing the sick in hospitals and workhouses. She would later write about her nursing experience in her Notes from Sick Rooms (1883). This is a discussion of good nursing practices, demonstrating fine attention to detail. A notable passage is her description of the misery caused by bread crumbs in the bed. In addition to dispensing practical nursing advice, she undertook social advocacy on the part of the sick and poor. She published a letter of protest on behalf of the inmates at St George's Union Workhouse in Fulham "for giving in to the temperance movement and cutting off the half-pint of beer". This ration allocated to the pauper women there had been removed at the insistence of the temperance campaigners (Pall Mall Gazette, 4 October 1879). This was an institution she visited regularly. (Note: Two letters were published in the Pall Mall Gazette, dated 3 and 16 October 1879, signed Julia Prinsep Stephen. 13, Hyde Park-gate South) She also wrote an impassioned defence of agnostic women (Agnostic Women, 8 September 1880), arguing against claims that agnosticism was incompatible with spirituality and philanthropy (see Quotations). She also drew on her experience of ministering to the sick and dying in making these arguments.

At home, Virginia Woolf describes how Julia used one side of the drawing room for dispensing advice and consolation, the "angel in the house". (Note: "Angel in the house" was the title of a popular poem (1854–1862) of the time by Coventry Patmore, which became a metaphor for the ideal woman. Virginia Woolf saw one of her generation's tasks was to combat this image — "Killing the Angel in the House was part of the occupation of a woman writer" Woolf lays out the problem with this metaphor in Professions for Women (1933), an essay read to the Women's Service League)

=== Views ===
Julia held firm views on the role of women in society. She was not a feminist, and has been described as an antifeminist, lending her name to the anti-suffrage movement in 1889. The novelist Mary Ward (1851–1920) and the Oxford Liberal set collected the names of the most prominent intellectual aristocracy, including Julia's friend Octavia Hill (1838–1912), and nearly a hundred other women to sign a petition "An Appeal Against Female Suffrage" in Nineteenth Century in June of that year. This earned her a rebuke from George Meredith, writing facetiously "for it would be to accuse you of the fatuousness of a Liberal Unionist to charge the true Mrs Leslie with this irrational obstructiveness", pretending that the signature must belong to another woman of the same name. Rather, Julia Stephen believed that women had their own role and their own role models. She referred her daughters to Florence Nightingale (1820–1910), Octavia Hill and Mary Ward as models. Her views on the role of women in society are firmly laid out in her Agnostic Women, namely that while men and women may operate in separate spheres, their work is of equal value. However, Julia's views on women and feminism need to be evaluated within the historical and cultural context in which she lived, being thoroughly an upper middle class Victorian woman. In her particular case the "separate spheres" were reversed from the post-industrial convention of the time, Leslie Stephen working from home while she worked outside of the home. Julia and her husband's views on this were very much in keeping with the predominant ethos of the time, agreeing with "the vast majority of their contemporaries— that men and women played different roles in life, roles conditioned by their physiology as well as their education". Despite this separation within the spheres of public and private life, she advocated for professionalism and competence by women within these, a viewpoint becoming more common in her time, and exemplified by her nursing activities.

Nor did her views preclude friendship with passionate advocates for women's rights and suffrage, such as the actress Elizabeth Robins. Robins recalls that her Madonna like face was somewhat misleading "she was a mixture of the Madonna and a woman of the world" and that when she came up with something more worldly, it was "so unexpected from that Madonna face, one thought it vicious". Julia Stephen was, in most respects, a conventional Victorian lady. She defended the hierarchical system of the live-in servants, the need to keep a constant watch over them, and believed a "strong bond" existed between the mistress of the house and those who serve. It was this conventionality that Woolf consciously separated herself from, in terms of a model of womanhood, with the Victorian expectations of social conformity, that Woolf described as "a machine into which our rebellious bodies were inserted".

=== Publications and other writings ===
Julia Stephen's literary canon consists of a book, a collection of children's stories and a number of unpublished essays. The first was a small volume, entitled Notes from Sick Rooms, published by her husband's publisher, Smith, Elder & Co. in October 1883, an account of her nursing experience together with a detailed manual of instruction. It was republished in 1980 and later published in conjunction with Virginia Woolf's On Being Ill (1926) in 2012. The second is a collection of stories she told to her children, entitled Stories for Children and written between 1880 and 1884. Her stories tended to promote the value of family life and the importance of being kind to animals. Sometimes, such as in Cat's Meat, they reflect the tensions in Julia's own life. She emerges from these writings as decisive, conservative, and pragmatic, with a wit that some considered almost shocking. Although she was unsuccessful in getting these published in her lifetime, they were eventually published, together with Notes from Sick Rooms and a collection of her essays, which had been in the possession of Quentin Bell, in 1993. She also wrote the biographical entry for Julia Margaret Cameron in the Dictionary of National Biography of which her husband was the first editor (1885–1891), one of the very few biographies of women to be found in this work, (Note: The other biography of a woman was by Leslie's sister, Caroline Stephen, who contributed the article on Mary Aikenhead) and an omission which drew the critical exclamation of Woolf "it is much to be regretted that no lives of maids ... are to be found in the Dictionary of National Biography". Among her essays was Agnostic women defending her philanthropy as an agnostic (see Social activism and Views), and two other essays addressing the management of households, and in particular servants.

==== List of publications ====
- Stephen, Julia D. (1987). Steele, Elizabeth; Gillespie, Dianne F (eds.). Julia Duckworth Stephen: Stories for Children, Essays for Adults. Syracuse University Press. ISBN 978-0-8156-2592-6.
  - Broughton, Panthea Reid (1989). "Julia Stephen's Prose: An Unintentional Self-Portrait". English Literature in Transition, 1880-1920 (Review). 22 (1): 125–128.
- Stephen, Mrs Leslie (1883). Notes from Sick Rooms. London: Smith, Elder, & Co.
  - Stephen, Julia Duckworth (1980) [1883]. Notes from sick rooms. Puckerbrush Press. ISBN 978-0-913006-16-0.
  - Woolf, Virginia (2012) [1926, 1883]. On Being Ill, with Notes from Sick Rooms by Julia Stephen. Paris Press. ISBN 978-1-930464-13-1. (Notes from Sick Rooms also in Stephen (1987)), see also Excerpt

Hadas, Rachel (14 December 2012). "Virginia Woolf and Julia Stephen". The Times Literary Supplement (Review).
Oram, Richard (17 April 2014). "Drawing parallels: Virginia Woolf's "On Being Ill" and Julia Stephen's "Notes from Sick Rooms"". Ransom Center Magazine (Review).
Ward-Vetrano, Gianna (4 October 2016). "Julia Stephen's "Notes from Sick Rooms"". The Unbearable Bookishness of Blogging (Review).
Anonymous (11 February 2015). "Out! damn crumbs, from Notes from Sick Rooms, by Mrs. Leslie Stephen (1883)". The Neglected Books Page (Review).

- J.P.S. (1885–1900). Cameron, Julia Margaret. New York Macmillan. p. 300., in Stephen (1886)

== Legacy ==
Three Generations

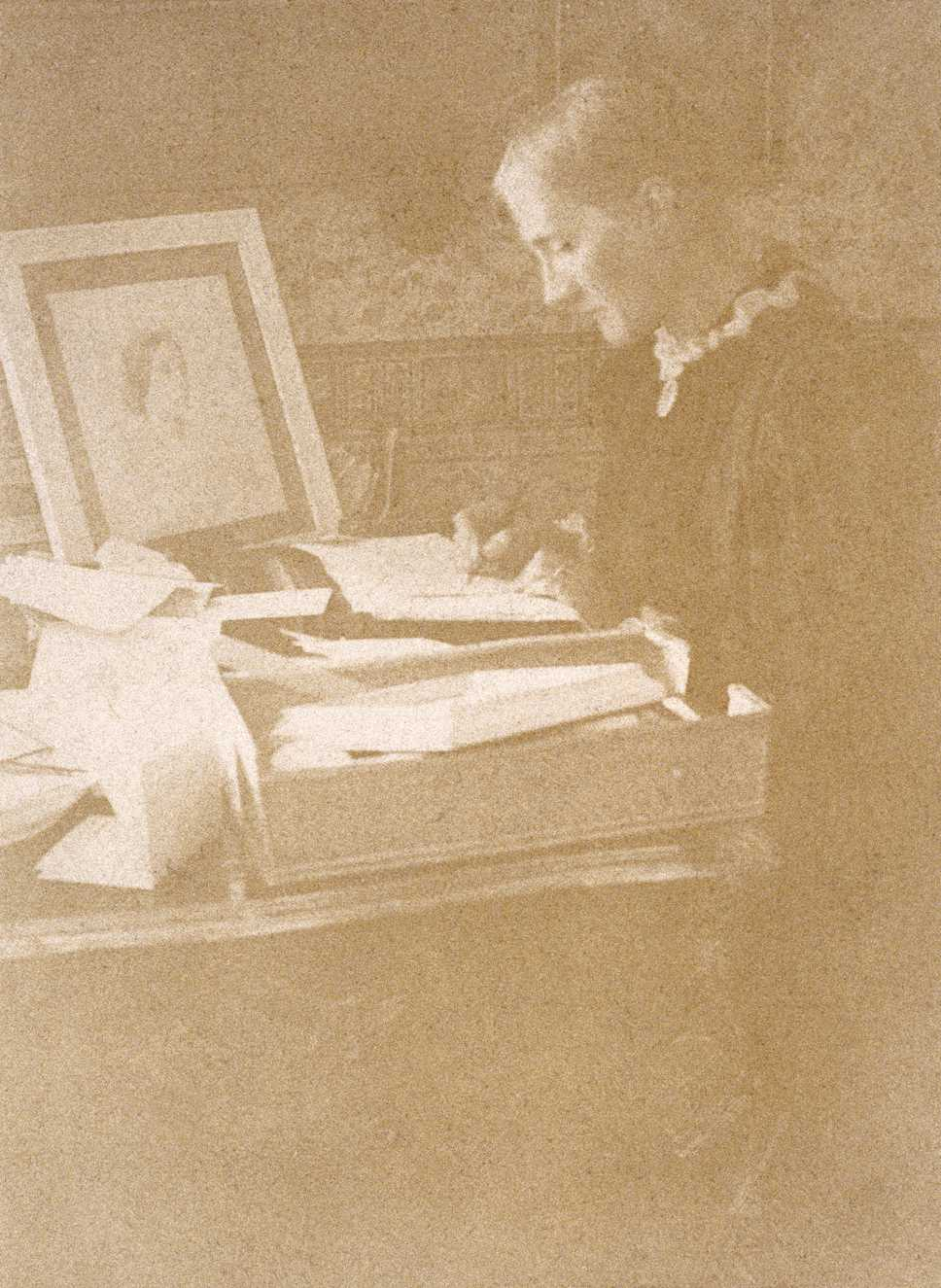
Julia writing at Talland House 1892, with drawing of her mother

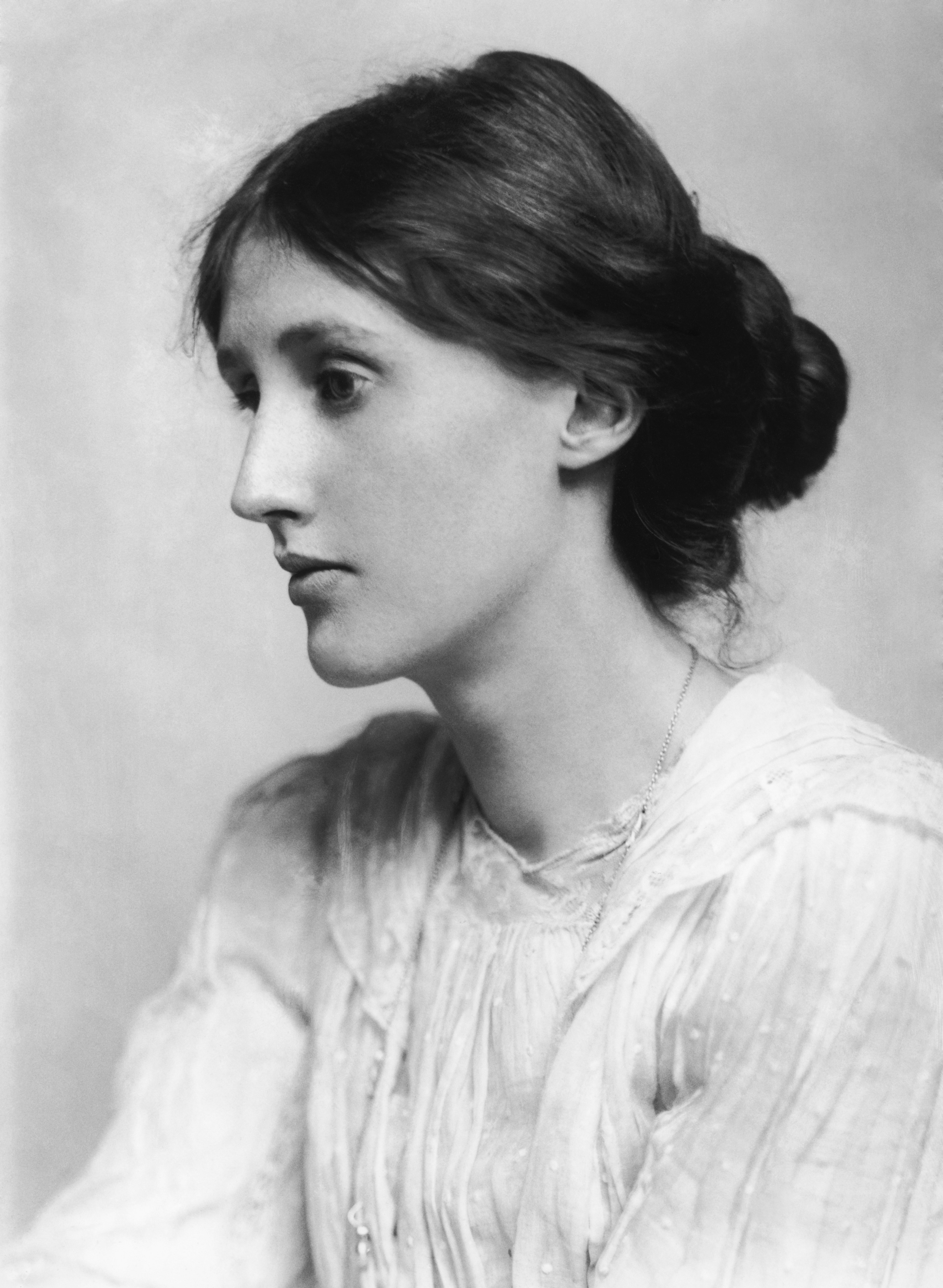
Virginia Woolf in 1902, with chignon, by Beresford

Julia Stephen was the mother of Bloomsbury. She has been described as an austerely beautiful muse of the Pre-Raphaelites, and her physical image comes down to us through countless paintings and photographs. George Watt's portrait of Julia (1875), originally hung in Leslie Stephen's study at Hyde Park Gate, later it was in Duncan Grant's studio at 22 Fitzroy Square for some time, and then at Vanessa Bell's Charleston Farmhouse in Sussex, where it still hangs. The family owned a number of the Julia Margaret Cameron portraits of Julia Stephen. After Leslie Stephen's death in 1904, 22 Hyde Park Gate was sold and the children moved to 46 Gordon Square, Bloomsbury, where they hung 5 of these on the right hand side of the entrance hall. Later, when her granddaughter Angelica Garnett moved into the Charleston Farmhouse in 1987, she hung them in the passageway. Other images come from the photographs of family and friends. These images formed an important link with their prematurely dead mother, for her children. Writing to her sister in 1908, Vanessa Bell refers to her wish to "gaze at the most beautiful of Aunt Julia's photographs incessantly". Otherwise, her image has been described as "elusive", for we know her largely through the construction of others, principally Leslie Stephen and Virginia Woolf, each with their own filters. As Lowe observes, Julia Stephen has been variously constructed as "Madonna", "Nurse", "Wife", "Mother" and "Phantom".

Quentin Bell considers her importance measured not so much in herself as in her influence on others. This was also the position taken by Leslie Stephen at the time of her death. Many of her children, and their descendants in turn, became notable. She played a part in the development of English thought and letters at the close of the nineteenth century. Julia Stephen conformed to the Victorian male image of the ideal woman, virtuous, beautiful, capable and accommodating, symbolised in Burne-Jones' Annunciation. Her conception of life was something she conveyed to her children with great effect. Baron Annan goes so far as to point out resemblances in literary style between her writing in Notes for Sickrooms, and that of Virginia Woolf. Although Julia's daughters rejected their Victorian heritage, their mother's influence appears in Woolf's low chignon hairstyle and wearing her mother's dress in Vogue in May 1926 (see image). Vanessa Bell too, would appear in one of her mother's dresses, such as the portrait of her by Duncan Grant (see image). (Note: In Vanessa Bell's library at the Charleston Farmhouse) Woolf also wrote with her mother's pen. (Note: "here I am experimenting with the parent of all pens—the black J, the pen, as I used to think it, along with other objects, as a child, because mother used it")

Throughout her life, Julia Stephen was a prodigious letter writer, and according to Leslie Stephen, during her mother's lifetime, they "never passed a day apart without exchanging letters", often several. After her death, The Julia Prinsep Stephen Nursing Association Fund was established to commemorate the life of a woman, Leslie Stephen described as one whose "frank kindly ways made her many friends among the poor".

=== Virginia Woolf ===
The intense scrutiny of Virginia Woolf's literary output (see Bibliography) has inevitably led to speculation as to her mother's influence, including psychoanalytic studies of mother and daughter. Woolf states that "my first memory, and in fact it is the most important of all my memories" is of her mother. Her memories of her mother are memories of an obsession and she suffered her first major breakdown on her mother's death in 1895, the loss having a profound lifelong effect. In many ways, her mother's profound influence on Virginia Woolf is conveyed in the latter's recollections, "there she is; beautiful, emphatic ... closer than any of the living are, lighting our random lives as with a burning torch, infinitely noble and delightful to her children". Woolf described her mother as an "invisible presence" in her life, and Rosenman argues that the mother-daughter relationships is a constant in Woolf's writing. She describes how Woolf's modernism needs to be viewed in relationship to her ambivalence towards her Victorian mother, the centre of the former's female identity, and her voyage to her own sense of autonomy. To Woolf, "Saint Julia" was both a martyr whose perfectionism was intimidating and a source of deprivation, by her absences real and virtual and premature death. Julia's influence and memory pervades Woolf's life and work, "she has haunted me", she wrote.

== Family trees ==
Ancestors of Julia Stephen

8. William Jackson
4. George Jackson (1758 – 1823)
9. Susannah Dean
2. Dr John Jackson (1804 – 1887)
10. William Howard (1749 – 1795)
5. Mary Howard (1781 – 1858)
11. Elizabeth Mitford (born 1747)
1. Julia Prinsep Jackson (1846 – 1895)
12. Thomas Pattle (1742 – 1818)
6. James Peter Pattle (1775 – 1845)
13. Sarah Haselby
3. Maria Pattle (1818 – 1892)
14. Chevalier Ambrose Pierre Antoine de l'Etang (1757 – 1840)
7. Adeline Maria de l'Etang (1793 – 1845)
15. Therese Josephe Blin de Grincourt (1767 – 1866)

Pattle-Antoine Family Tree

James Pattle 1775-1845	m. 1811; Adeline Antoine 1793-1845
Adeline; 1812-1836	Eliza; 1814-1818	Julia Margaret; 1815-1879	m. 1835; Henry Prinsep; 1792–1878	Sara; 1816-1887	m. 1837; John Jackson; 1804–1887	Maria; 1818-1892	Louisa; 1821-1873	m. 1850; Earl Somers; 1819–1883	Virginia; 1827-1910	Sophia; 1829-1911
Valentine; 1838–1904	m.1856 Halford Vaughan; 1811–1885	Adeline Maria; 1837-1881	m.1862 Herbert Fisher; 1826–1903	Mary Louisa; 1840-1916 (Note: Mary Louisa and Herbert Fisher's children included 1. Florence Henrietta Fisher (1864–1920) who married Frederic William Maitland (1850–1906) in 1886, who wrote the biography of Leslie Stephen and 2. H. A. L. Fisher (1865–1940), whose daughter Mary Bennett (1913–2005), wrote the biography of the Jackson family)	m. (1)1867; Herbert Duckworth; 1833−1870	Julia Prinsep; 1846–1895	m. (2) 1878; Leslie Stephen (Note: Leslie Stephen had one daughter, Laura (1870–1945), by his first wife, Minny Thackeray); 1832–1904	Isabella Caroline; 1851–1921	Adeline Marie; 1852–1920
Laura; 1870–1945
George; 1868–1934	Stella; 1869-1897	Gerald; 1870–1937	Duncan Grant; 1885–1978	Vanessa; 1879–1961	m.1907 Clive Bell; 1881–1964	Thoby; 1880–1906	Virginia; 1882–1941	m. 1912; Leonard Woolf; 1880–1969	Adrian; 1883–1948
Angelica; 1918–2012	Julian; 1908 –1937	Quentin; 1910–1996	Annie Popham; 1916–2018

Stephen Family Tree

Robert Wilberforce; 1728–1768	Elizabeth Bird; 1730–1798
m.(1) 1783; Anna Stent; 1758–1790	James Stephen; 1758–1832	m.(2) 1800; Sarah Wilberforce; 1757–1816	William Wilberforce; 1759–1833	John Venn; 1759–1813	m. 1789; Katherine King; 1760–1803
William Makepeace Thackeray; 1811–1863	m. 1836; Isabella Gethin Shawe; 1816–1893	James; 1789–1859	1814; Jane Catherine; 1793–1875
m. 1877; Richmond Ritchie	Annie; 1837–1919	m.(1); Minnie Thackeray; 1840–1875	Leslie; 1832−1904	m.(2) 1878; Julia Duckworth; 1846–1895	James Fitzjames; 1829–1894	Caroline; 1834–1909
Laura; 1870–1945	4 see Pattle tree

== Bibliography ==
=== Books and theses ===
- Burstyn, Joan N. (2016) [1980]. Victorian Education and the Ideal of Womanhood. Taylor & Francis. ISBN 978-1-315-44430-7.
- Cunningham, David; Fisher, Andrew; Mays, Sas, eds. (2005). Photography and Literature in the Twentieth Century. Cambridge Scholars Press. ISBN 978-1-904303-46-6.
- Deats, Sara Munson; Lenker, Lagretta Tallent, eds. (1999). Aging and Identity: A Humanities Perspective. Greenwood Publishing Group. ISBN 978-0-275-96479-5.
- Ender, Evelyne (2005). Architexts of Memory: Literature, Science, and Autobiography. University of Michigan Press. ISBN 978-0-472-03104-7.
- Hirsch, Marianne (1989). The Mother / Daughter Plot: Narrative, Psychoanalysis, Feminism. Indiana University Press. ISBN 978-0-253-11575-1.
- Kaufman, Peter Iver; Bezio, Kristin M.S., eds. (2017). Cultural Icons and Cultural Leadership. Edward Elgar Publishing. ISBN 978-1-78643-806-5.
- Llewellyn-Jones, Rosie (2017). The Louisa Parlby Album: Watercolours from Murshidabad 1795–1803 (PDF) (Exhibition catalogue: 23 October – 1 December 2017). London: Francesca Galloway. ISBN 978-0-956-914-767.
- Rosner, Victoria (2008). Modernism and the Architecture of Private Life. Columbia University Press. ISBN 978-0-231-13305-0.
- Sheppard, FHW, ed. (1975). Survey of London. Vol. 38. South Kensington Museums Area. London: Institute of Historical Research (British History Online). ISBN 978-0-485-48238-6. see also Survey of London
- Thomas, Gillian (1992). A Position to Command Respect: Women and the Eleventh Britannica. Scarecrow Press. ISBN 978-0-8108-2567-3.

==== Julia Margaret Cameron ====
- Cameron, Julia Margaret (1973) [1926 Hogarth Press, edited by Leonard and Virginia Woolf]. Powell, Tristram (ed.). Victorian photographs of famous men & fair women. Introductions by Virginia Woolf and Roger Fry (Revised ed.). D. R. Godine. ISBN 978-0-87923-076-0. (Digital edition)
- Cameron, Julia Margaret (1994) [1863]. For my best beloved sister, Mia: an album of photographs by Julia Margaret Cameron. The University of New Mexico Art Museum. ISBN 978-0-944282-17-5.
- Cox, Julian; Ford, Colin (2003). Julia Margaret Cameron: The Complete Photographs. Getty Publications. ISBN 978-0-89236-681-1. (see also Getty Publications Virtual Library)
- Ford, Colin (2003). Julia Margaret Cameron: A Critical Biography. Getty Publications. ISBN 978-0-89236-707-8.
- Olsen, Victoria (2003). From Life: Julia Margaret Cameron & Victorian Photography. Palgrave Macmillan. ISBN 978-1-4039-6019-1.
- Wolf, Sylvia, ed. (1998). Julia Margaret Cameron's Women. Art Institute of Chicago. ISBN 978-0-300-07781-0. also available through MOMA here
  - Nordstrom, Alison Devine (1 April 2001). "Julia Margaret Cameron's Women (review)". Victorian Studies. 43 (3): 499–501. doi:10.1353/vic.2001.0072. ISSN 1527-2052. S2CID 144738863.

==== Leslie Stephen ====
- Annan, Noel Gilroy Annan Baron (1951). Leslie Stephen, His Thought and Character in Relation to His Time. AMS Press. ISBN 978-0-404-14021-2.
- Annan, Baron Noël Gilroy Annan (1984). Leslie Stephen: the Godless Victorian. Random House. ISBN 978-0-394-53061-1.
- Bicknell, John W, ed. (1996a). Selected Letters of Leslie Stephen: Volume 1. 1864-1882. Basingstoke: Macmillan. ISBN 9781349248872.
- Bicknell, John W, ed. (1996b). Selected Letters of Leslie Stephen: Volume 2. 1882-1904. Ohio State University Press. ISBN 978-0-8142-0691-1.
- Broughton, Trev Lynn (2004). Men of Letters, Writing Lives. Routledge. ISBN 978-1-134-89156-6.
- Fenwick, Gillian (1993). Leslie Stephen's life in letters: a bibliographical study. Scolar Press. ISBN 9780859679121.
  - Review. John W. Bicknell Victorian Studies 1994
- MacCarthy, Desmond (1937). Leslie Stephen: The Leslie Stephen Lecture delivered before the University of Cambridge on 27 May 1937. CUP Archive. (exceepts also at Google Books
- Maitland, Frederic William (1906). The life and letters of Leslie Stephen. London: Duckworth & Co..
- Stephen, Leslie (1977) [1895]. Bell, Alan S (ed.). Sir Leslie Stephen's Mausoleum Book. Clarendon Press. ISBN 978-0-19-812084-1. (excerpts in MacCarthy (1937)
- Stephen, Leslie, ed. (1886). Dictionary of National Biography. vol. VIII Burton Cantwell. London: Elder, Smith & Co. (see also Dictionary of National Biography)

==== Vanessa Bell ====
- Bell, Vanessa (1993). Marler, Regina (ed.). The Selected Letters of Vanessa Bell. Pantheon Books. ISBN 978-0-679-41939-6.
  - Marler, Regina. Biographical introduction. pp. xvii–xviii.
- Dejardin, Ian AC, ed. (2017). Vanessa Bell. Philip Wilson Publishers. ISBN 978-1-78130-051-0.
- Field, Claudia Louise (2015). Focusing the lens: the role of travel and photography in the personal and working lives of Vanessa Bell and Duncan Grant (PhD thesis). Department of Art History, University of Sussex.
- Spalding, Frances (2015). Vanessa Bell: Portrait of the Bloomsbury Artist. I.B.Tauris. ISBN 978-1-78453-241-3.

==== Virginia Woolf and Bloomsbury ====
- Acheson, James, ed. (2017). Virginia Woolf. Palgrave Macmillan. ISBN 978-1-137-43083-0.
- Bell, Quentin (1972). Virginia Woolf: A Biography. Harcourt Brace Jovanovich. ISBN 978-0-15-693580-7.
- Black, Naomi (2004). Virginia Woolf as Feminist. Cornell University Press. ISBN 978-0-8014-8877-1.
- Bond, Alma Halbert (2000). Who Killed Virginia Woolf?: A Psychobiography. Insight Books Human Sciences. ISBN 978-0-595-00205-4.
  - Poole, Roger (1991). "Virginia Woolf: The Impact of Childhood Sexual Abuse on Her Life and Work, and: Who Killed Virginia Woolf?: A Psychobiography, and: Virginia Woolf: A Study of the Short Fiction, and: Virginia Woolf: Strategist of Language". MFS Modern Fiction Studies (Review). 37 (2): 300–305. doi:10.1353/mfs.0.0773. S2CID 162382065.
- Boyd, Elizabeth French (1976). Bloomsbury heritage, their mothers and their aunts. New York: Taplinger Publishing Company. ISBN 978-0-8008-0821-1.
- Briggs, Julia (2006). Virginia Woolf: An Inner Life. Harcourt. ISBN 978-0-15-603229-2.
- Caws, Mary Ann; Wright, Sarah Bird (1999). Bloomsbury and France: Art and Friends. Oxford University Press. ISBN 978-0-19-802781-2.
- Curtis, Vanessa (2002). Virginia Woolf's Women. University of Wisconsin Press. ISBN 978-0-299-18340-0.
- Dell, Marion (2015). Virginia Woolf's Influential Forebears: Julia Margaret Cameron, Anny Thackeray Ritchie and Julia Prinsep Stephen. Palgrave Macmillan UK. ISBN 978-1-137-49728-4. see also excerpt here
- DeSalvo, Louise A. (1989). Virginia Woolf: The Impact of Childhood Sexual Abuse on Her Life and Work. Women's Press. ISBN 978-0-7043-5042-7.
  - Beattie, L. Elisabeth (23 July 1989). "In short". New York Times (Review).
  - Poole, Roger (1991). "Virginia Woolf: The Impact of Childhood Sexual Abuse on Her Life and Work, and: Who Killed Virginia Woolf?: A Psychobiography, and: Virginia Woolf: A Study of the Short Fiction, and: Virginia Woolf: Strategist of Language". MFS Modern Fiction Studies (Review). 37 (2): 300–305. doi:10.1353/mfs.0.0773. S2CID 162382065.
- Forrester, Viviane (2015). Virginia Woolf: A Portrait. Columbia University Press. ISBN 978-0-231-53512-0.
- Goldman, Jane (2006). The Cambridge Introduction to Virginia Woolf. Cambridge University Press. ISBN 978-1-139-45788-0.
- Gordon, Lyndall (1984). Virginia Woolf: A Writer's Life. Oxford University Press. ISBN 978-0-19-811723-0.
- Holtby, Winifred (2007) [1932]. Virginia Woolf: A Critical Memoir. Bloomsbury Academic. ISBN 978-0-8264-9443-6.
  - Curtis, Vanessa (14 January 2007). "Virginia Woolf: A critical memoir by Winifred Holtby". The Independent (Review).
- Humm, Maggie (2006). Snapshots of Bloomsbury: The Private Lives of Virginia Woolf and Vanessa Bell. Rutgers University Press. ISBN 978-0-8135-3706-1.
- Humm, Maggie (2010). Edinburgh Companion to Virginia Woolf and the Arts. Edinburgh University Press. ISBN 978-0-7486-3553-5.
- Lee, Hermione (1999). Virginia Woolf. Vintage Books. ISBN 978-0-375-70136-8. (excerpt - Chapter 1)
- Licence, Amy (2015). Living in Squares, Loving in Triangles: The Lives and Loves of Virginia Woolf and the Bloomsbury Group. Amberley Publishing Limited. ISBN 978-1-4456-4579-7.
- Light, Alison (2007). Mrs Woolf and the Servants: The Hidden Heart of Domestic Service. Penguin Books Limited. ISBN 978-0-14-190213-5.
  - Messud, Claire (17 October 2008). "A Maid of One's Own". New York Times (Review).
- Lilienfeld, Jane (2016) [1999]. Reading Alcoholisms: Theorizing Character and Narrative in Selected Novels of Thomas Hardy, James Joyce, and Virginia Woolf. Palgrave Macmillan US. ISBN 978-1-137-10023-8.
- Marcus, Jane, ed. (1981). New Feminist Essays on Virginia Woolf. Palgrave Macmillan UK. ISBN 978-1-349-05486-2.
- Nadel, Ira (2016). Virginia Woolf. Reaktion Books. ISBN 978-1-78023-712-1.
- Reid, Panthea (1996). Art and Affection: A Life of Virginia Woolf. Oxford University Press. ISBN 978-0-19-510195-9.
- Rosenman, Ellen Bayuk (1986). The Invisible Presence: Virginia Woolf and the Mother-daughter Relationship. Louisiana State University Press. ISBN 978-0-8071-1290-8.
  - Caramagno, Thomas C. (1989). "Review of Virginia Woolf and the Real World; The Invisible Presence: Virginia Woolf and the Mother-Daughter Relationship". Modern Philology (Review). 86 (3): 324–328. doi:10.1086/391719. JSTOR 438044.
- Rosner, Victoria, ed. (2014). The Cambridge Companion to the Bloomsbury Group. Cambridge University Press. ISBN 978-1-107-01824-2.
- Simpson, Kathryn (2016). Woolf: A Guide for the Perplexed. Bloomsbury Publishing. ISBN 978-1-4725-9068-8.
- Snaith, Anna, ed. (2007). Palgrave Advances in Virginia Woolf Studies. Palgrave Macmillan UK. ISBN 978-0-230-20604-5.
- Squier, Susan Merrill (1985). Virginia Woolf and London: The Sexual Politics of the City. University of North Carolina Press. ISBN 978-1-4696-3991-8.
- Stape, John Henry (1995). Virginia Woolf: Interviews and Recollections. University of Iowa Press. ISBN 978-0-87745-494-6.
- Wilson, Jean Moorcroft (1987). Virginia Woolf's London: A Guide to Bloomsbury and Beyond. Tauris Parke Paperbacks. ISBN 978-1-86064-644-7.
- Zamith, Maria Cândida; Flora, Luísa, eds. (2007). Virginia Woolf: Three Centenary Celebrations. Universidade do Porto. ISBN 978-972-8932-23-7. additional excerpt
- Zwerdling, Alex (1986). Virginia Woolf and the Real World. University of California Press. ISBN 978-0-520-06184-2.
  - Caramagno, Thomas C. (1989). "Review of Virginia Woolf and the Real World; The Invisible Presence: Virginia Woolf and the Mother-Daughter Relationship". Modern Philology (Review). 86 (3): 324–328. doi:10.1086/391719. JSTOR 438044.
  - Middleton, Victoria (1987). "Alex Zwerdling: Virginia Woolf and the Real World". Rocky Mountain Review of Language and Literature. 41 (4): 277–278. doi:10.2307/1347313. JSTOR 1347313.
  - Pearce, Richard (Autumn 1987). "Review: Virginia Woolf's Reality". Novel: A Forum on Fiction (Review). 21 (1): 93–96. doi:10.2307/1345993. JSTOR 1345993.

==== Works by Virginia Woolf ====
- Woolf, Virginia (2016) [1929]. A Room of One's Own. Read Books Limited. ISBN 978-1-4733-6305-2. (see A Room of One's Own)
- Woolf, Virginia (1985) [1976]. Schulkind, Jeanne (ed.). Moments of being: unpublished autobiographical writings (2nd ed.). Harcourt Brace Jovanovich. ISBN 978-0-15-162034-0. (see Moments of Being)
  - Schulkind, Jeanne (2007). Preface to the Second Edition. p. 6. Bibcode:2007ess..bookD..17M., in Woolf (1985)
  - Schulkind, Jeanne. Introduction. pp. 11–24., in Woolf (1985)
  - Reminiscences. 1908. pp. 25–60.
  - A Sketch of the Past. 1940. pp. 61–160. (Note: Originally published in 1976, the discovery in 1980 of a 77 page typescript acquired by the British Library, containing 27 pages of new material necessitated a new edition in 1985. This was inserted following page 107 of the first edition. All page references to Sketches are to the second edition, otherwise to the first edition of Moments of Being)
  - 22 Hyde Park Gate. 1921. pp. 162–178.
- Woolf, Virginia (1933). Professions for Women. Archived from the original on 22 April 2017., in Adelaide (2015)
- Woolf, Virginia (2016) [1938]. Three Guineas. Read Books Limited. ISBN 978-1-4733-6301-4. (full text ) see also Three Guineas
- Woolf, Virginia (2004) [1927]. To the Lighthouse. Collector's Library. ISBN 978-1-904633-49-5. see also To the Lighthouse
  - Texts at Woolf Online

Collections

- Woolf, Virginia (2013). Delphi Complete Works of Virginia Woolf (Illustrated). Delphi Classics. ISBN 978-1-908909-19-0.
  - "eBooks@Adelaide". Library of University of Adelaide. 22 September 2015. Archived from the original on 12 April 2018.
- Woolf, Virginia (2009). Bradshaw, David (ed.). Selected Essays. Oxford University Press. ISBN 978-0-19-955606-9.
- Woolf, Virginia (1975–1980). Nicolson, Nigel; Banks, Joanne Trautmann (eds.). The Letters of Virginia Woolf 6 vols. New York: Harcourt Brace Jovanovich. ISBN 9780151509263.
  - Woolf, Virginia (1975). The Letters of Virginia Woolf: Volume 3 1923-1928. Harcourt Brace Jovanovich. ISBN 978-0-15-150926-3.
- Woolf, Virginia (1977–1984). Bell, Anne Oliver (ed.). The Diary of Virginia Woolf 5 vols. Houghton Mifflin.
  - Woolf, Virginia (1979). The Diary of Virginia Woolf Volume One 1915–1919. HarperCollins Publishers. ISBN 978-0-544-31037-7.
  - Woolf, Virginia (1981). The Diary of Virginia Woolf Volume Two 1920–1924. Penguin. ISBN 978-0-14-005283-1.

==== Biography (other) ====
- Bell, Quentin (1997). Elders and Betters. Pimlico. ISBN 978-0-7126-7396-9.
- Bennett, Mary (2002). Who was Dr Jackson?: Two Calcutta Families, 1830-1855. BACSA. ISBN 978-0-907799-78-8.
  - Vogeler, Martha S. (11 July 2014). "Bennett, Mary. Who Was Dr. Jackson? Two Calcutta Families: 1830–1855. London: British Association for Cemeteries in South Asia. 2002. Pp. xv, 116. £12. ISBN 0-90779-9-78-71". Albion (Review). 36 (2): 388–389. doi:10.2307/4054289. JSTOR 4054289.
- Burke, Bernard (1858). A Genealogical and Heraldic Dictionary of the Landed Gentry of Great Britain and Ireland. London: Harrison.
- Burke, Bernard (1894). A Genealogical and Heraldic History of the Landed Gentry of Great Britain & Ireland. London: Harrison. ISBN 9780394487267.
- Dunn, Jane (1990). A Very Close Conspiracy: Vanessa Bell and Virginia Woolf. Random House. ISBN 978-1-4464-3465-9. (additional excerpts)
- Garnett, Angelica (2011) [1985]. Deceived With Kindness. Random House. ISBN 978-1-4464-7525-6.
- Gérin, Winifred (1981). Anne Thackeray Ritchie: a biography. Oxford University Press. ISBN 978-0-19-812664-5.
- Lowe, Gill (2005). Versions of Julia: five biographical constructions of Julia Stephen. London: Cecil Woolf. ISBN 978-1-897967-14-0.
  - Dell, Marion (January 2006). "Versions of Julia: Five Biographical Constructions of Julia Stephen". The Virginia Woolf Bulletin (Review) (21): 56–58.
- Newman, Hilary (2006). Laura Stephen: a memoir. London: Cecil Woolf. ISBN 978-1-897967-39-3.
  - Marshik, Celia (Fall–Winter 2008). "Laura Stephen: A Memoir / Julian Bell, the Violent Pacifist / Conversation with Julian Fry / Roger Fry, Apostle of Good Taste, and Venice" (PDF). Virginia Woolf Miscellany (Review) (74): 30.
- Rose, Phyllis (1983). Parallel Lives: Five Victorian Marriages. Vintage Books. ISBN 978-0-394-72580-2.
- Stephen, Virginia; Stephen, Vanessa; Stephen, Thoby (2005). Hyde Park Gate News: The Stephen Family Newspaper. Hesperus Press. ISBN 978-1-84391-701-4.
  - "'Hyde Park Gate News', a magazine by Virginia Woolf and Vanessa Bell". Collection items (Manuscript). British Library. Archived from the original on 17 June 2019.
- Tolley, Christopher (1997). Domestic Biography: The Legacy of Evangelicalism in Four Nineteenth-century Families. Clarendon Press. ISBN 978-0-19-820651-4.
- Venn, John (2012) [1904 Macmillan, London]. Annals of a Clerical Family: Being Some Account of the Family and Descendants of William Venn, Vicar of Otterton, Devon, 1600-1621. Cambridge University Press. ISBN 978-1-108-04492-9. also Internet archive

=== Chapters and contributions ===
- Banks, Joanne Trautmann (1999). The Aging Artist The Sad but Instructive Case of Virginia Woolf. Bloomsbury Academic. pp. 115–126. ISBN 9780275964795., in Deats & Lenker (1999)
- Birrento, Ana Clara. Virginia Woolf: Moments of Being (PDF). pp. 61–72., in Zamith & Flora (2007)
- Flint, Kate. Victorian Roots: The sense of the past in Mrs Dalloway and To the Lighthouse. pp. 46–59., in Acheson (2017)
- Gillespie, Diane F (1993). The elusive Julia Stephen. Syracuse University Press. pp. 1–28. ISBN 9780815625926., in Stephen (1987)
- Gillespie, Diane F (1993). Essays for adults. Syracuse University Press. pp. 195–213. ISBN 9780815625926., in Stephen (1987)
- Humm, Maggie (2005). Memory and photography: The photo albums of Virginia Woolf. Cambridge Scholars Press. pp. 42–51. ISBN 9781904303466., in Cunningham et al (2005) (additional excerpts)
- Milroy, Sarah. Some rough eloquence. pp. 25–39., in Dejardin (2017)
- Mullin, Katherine. Victorian Bloomsbury. pp. 19–32., in Rosner (2014)
- Goldsworthy, Vesna. The Bloomsbury Narcissus. pp. 183–197., in Rosner (2014)
- Paulsell, Stephanie (28 July 2017). Family resemblances: religion around Virginia Woolf. Edward Elgar. pp. 81–102. ISBN 9781786438065., in Kaufman & Bezio (2017)
- Hussey, Mark. Biographical approaches. pp. 83–97., in Snaith (2007)
- Daugherty, Beth Rigel. Feminist approaches. pp. 98–124., in Snaith (2007)
- Minow-Pinkney, Makiko (28 March 2007). Psychonalytic approaches. Springer. pp. 60–82. ISBN 9780230206045., in Snaith (2007)
- Woolf, Leonard (4 March 1965). "Virginia Woolf: Writer and personality". The Listener: 327–328. ISBN 9780877454946., reprinted in Stape 1995, pp. 147–153

=== Articles ===
- Bell, Alan (24 May 2012). "Stephen, Sir Leslie (1832–1904)". Oxford Dictionary of National Biography (online ed.). Oxford University Press. doi:10.1093/ref:odnb/36271. (Subscription, Wikipedia Library access or UK public library membership required.)
- Bell, Quentin (1965). "The Mausoleum Book". Review of English Literature. 6 (1): 9–18.
- Dahl, Christopher C. (1983). "Virginia Woolf's "Moments of Being" and Autobiographical Tradition in the Stephen Family". Journal of Modern Literature. 10 (2): 175–196. JSTOR 3831120.
- Garnett, Jane (23 September 2004). "Stephen [née Jackson], Julia Prinsep (1846–1895)". Oxford Dictionary of National Biography (online ed.). Oxford University Press. doi:10.1093/ref:odnb/46943. (Subscription, Wikipedia Library access or UK public library membership required.)
- Gordon, Lyndall (2004). "Woolf [née Stephen], (Adeline) Virginia". Oxford Dictionary of National Biography (online ed.). Oxford University Press. doi:10.1093/ref:odnb/37018. (Subscription, Wikipedia Library access or UK public library membership required.)
- Hite, Molly (10 January 2000). "Virginia Woolf's Two Bodies". Genders.
- Hughes, Kathryn (20 November 2010). "The Finger: A Handbook by Angus Trumble – review". The Guardian.
- Humm, Maggie (2006). "The Stephen sisters as young photographers". Canvas (15). Archived from the original on 17 January 2018.
- Koutsantoni; Oakley, Madeleine (2 April 2014). "Hypothesis of Autism and Psychosis in the Case of Laura Makepeace Stephen". Disability Studies. 4 (3). doi:10.2139/ssrn.2418709.
- Lewis, Alison M (Autumn 2000). "Caroline Emelia Stephen (1834-1909) and Virginia Woolf (1882-1941): A Quaker Influence on Modern English Literature". Quaker Theology (3).
- Thurman, Judith (17 February 2003). "Angels and Instincts: A Julia Margaret Cameron retrospective". The New Yorker.

=== Websites ===
- Eve, Kimberly (19 November 2017). "Victorian Musings".
- Gerard, Andre (2018). "Patremoir Press". Archived from the original on 3 January 2018.
- Lee, Christina (15 October 2015). "A Beautiful Mind – Laura Makepeace Stephen and the Earlswood Asylum medical archives".
- Melani, Lilia (2 March 2011). "The Angel in the House". William Makepeace Thackeray. Department of English, Brooklyn College, City University of New York.
- Olsen, Victoria (1 February 2012). "Looking for Laura". Open Letters Monthly. Archived from the original on 21 January 2018.
- Richardson, Phyllis (24 March 2015). "Tales from Talland House". Unbound. Archived from the original on 2 January 2018.
- Victorian Web (29 September 2014). "Funerary sculpture: Sir Leslie Stephen". The Victorian Web.
- "Androom Archives". 2017.
- "Find a will. Index to wills and administrations (1858-1995)". Calendars of the Grants of Probate and Letters of Administration. The National Archives.
- "Duckworth, Herbert (DKWT851H)". A Cambridge Alumni Database. University of Cambridge.
- NPG. "Maurice Beck and Helen Macgregor (1886-1960)". National Portrait Gallery, London.

Genealogy

- Vine, Nikki. "Nikki's Family History and Wells Local History Pages".
- Wood, Dudley (3 November 2017). "Family Histories of Wood of Kent, Bone of Hampshire, Lloyd of Cheshire, Thompson of West Yorkshire".
- "Relatives of Virginia Woolf". 22 March 2011., in Smith (2017)
  - "Julia Prinsep Stephen (1846 - 1895): Wife/mother/writer/volunteer". Smith College., in Smith (2017)

Virginia Woolf

- Brooks, Rebecca Beatrice (2018). "The Virginia Woolf Blog".
  - Brooks, Rebecca Beatrice (8 April 2015). "Virginia Woolf's Family". The Virginia Woolf Blog. Archived from the original on 17 August 2021.
- Deegan, Marilyn; Shillingsburg, Peter, eds. (2018). "Woolf Online: A digital archive of Virginia Woolf's To the Lighthouse (1927)". Society of Authors. Archived from the original on 29 October 2019.
- Roe, Dinah (2011). "Virginia Woolf and Holman Hunt go To The Lighthouse". Pre-Raphaelites in the city.
- Wilkes, Robert (5 August 2014). "Virginia Woolf and the Victorian Art World". Pre-Raphaelite Reflections.
- British Library (2018). "To the Lighthouse". 20th century works. 37018. Archived from the original on 2 December 2016.
- "Woolf, Creativity and Madness: From Freud to FMRI". Smith College Libraries: Online exhibits. Northampton MA: Smith College Libraries.
- "Virginia Woolf Society of Great Britain". Archived from the original on 18 December 2017.

=== Images ===
- Kukil, Karen V. (2003). "Woolf in the World: A Pen and a Press of Her Own" (Exhibition catalogue). Northampton MA: Smith College.
- Kukil, Karen V. (2011). "Leslie Stephen's Photograph Album" (Exhibition catalogue: photograph album). Northampton MA: Smith College.
- Tietze, Anna (2008). "Abe Bailey Biography". Abe Bailey Collection. Archived from the original on 7 May 2018.
  - "38 Bryanston Square - Exterior". n.d.
  - "38 Bryanston Square - Interiors 1908". Historic England.
- Woolf, Virginia (1983). "Virginia Woolf Monk's House photographs, ca. 1867-1967 (MS Thr 564)". Harvard Theatre Collection, Houghton Library, Harvard Library.
  - "Virginia Woolf Monk's House photographs, ca. 1860-1970. Selections from MS Thr 564".
  - "Virginia Woolf Monk's House photograph album (MH-4), 1890-1947 (inclusive), 1923-1939 (bulk). MS Thr 651".
- "Stephen Family Photo Album" (Photograph album)., in Deegan & Shillingsburg (2018)
- Smith, Patti (2006). "Vanessa Bell's Library, Duncan Grant's painting of Vanessa Bell in her Mother's Dress" (Photograph). Robert Miller Gallery.
- Beck, Maurice; Macgregor, Helen (May 1926). "Virginia Woolf tries on her mother's Victorian dress, May 1926" (Photograph). Vogue. (Note: Maurice Beck and Helen Macgregor, who ran a studio in Marylebone, were chief photographers for British Vogue)
- "22 Hyde Park Gate". Walking London one postcode at a time: SW7: Beyond our (South) Ken (Photograph). 16 August 2013.
- "Map of location of 22 Hyde Park Gate". Google Earth (Map).

Collections

- Cameron, Julia Margaret (2017). "Mrs. Herbert Duckworth" (Photograph). New York: The Metropolitan Museum of Art.
- Cameron, Julia Margaret (1864). "Julia Jackson" (Photograph). London: Victoria and Albert Museum.
- Cameron, Julia Margaret. "Julia Margaret Cameron". Artists (Photographs). Los Angeles: J Paul Getty Museum.
- Watts, George Frederic. "Julia Stephen, 1870". Art UK (Painting). Charleston Farmhouse: Arts Council England.
- Bell, Vanessa. "The Red Dress 1929". Art UK (Painting). Royal Pavilion & Museums, Brighton & Hove: Arts Council England.
- "Julia Prinsep Stephen (née Jackson, formerly Mrs Duckworth) (1846-1895), Beauty and philanthropist; former wife of Herbert Duckworth, and later wife of Sir Leslie Stephen; mother of Virginia Woolf and Vanessa Bell" (Museum collection). London: National Portrait Gallery.
