= Leslie Stephen =

English writer and mountaineer (1832–1904)

Sir Leslie Stephen KCB FBA
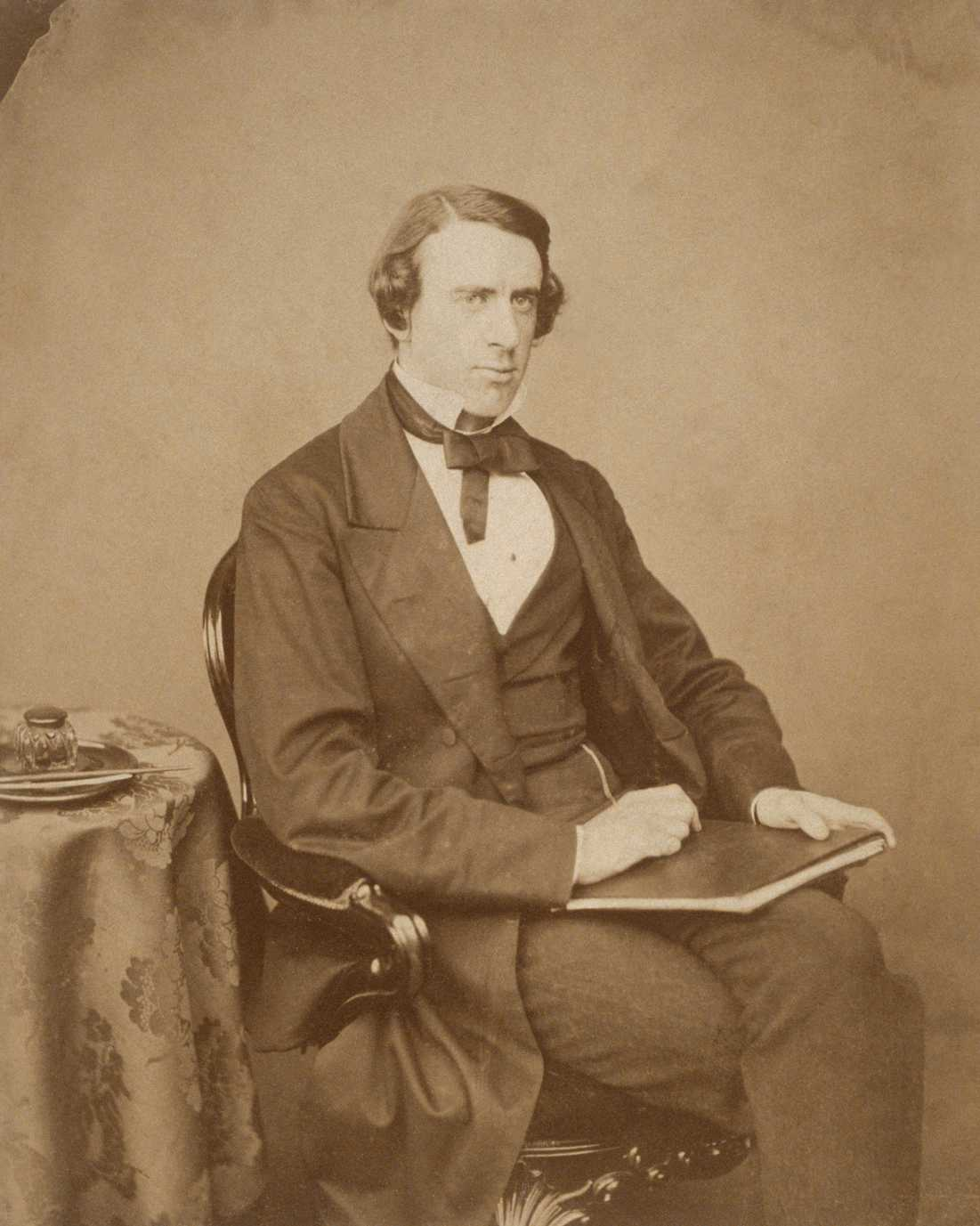
- Stephen c. 1860
- Born: 28 November 1832; Kensington Gore, London, England
- Died: 22 February 1904 (aged 71); Kensington, London, England
- Education: Eton College
- Alma mater: King's College, London; Trinity Hall, Cambridge
- Occupations: Writer, historian, biographer, mountaineer and activist
- Spouses: Harriet Thackeray (1867–1875); Julia Jackson (1878–1895)
- Children: 5, see list: Laura (1870–1945); Vanessa (1879–1961); Thoby (1880–1906); Virginia (1882–1941); Adrian (1883–1948)
- Parents: Sir James Stephen (1789–1859); Jane Venn (1793–1875)
- Relatives: See list: James Stephen (grandfather); Albert Venn Dicey (cousin); John Venn (cousin); Julian Bell (grandson); Quentin Bell (grandson); Angelica Garnett (granddaughter)

Sir Leslie Stephen (28 November 1832 – 22 February 1904) was an English author, critic, historian, biographer, mountaineer, and an Ethical movement activist. He was also the father of Virginia Woolf and Vanessa Bell and the founder of England's Dictionary of National Biography.

== Life ==
Stephen came from a distinguished intellectual family, and was born at a house on Kensington Gore, later 42 Hyde Park Gate, in London, the son of Sir James Stephen and his wife, Jane Catherine (née Venn). His father was Colonial Undersecretary of State and a noted abolitionist. He was the fourth of five children, his siblings including James Fitzjames Stephen (1829–1894) and Caroline Emelia Stephen (1834–1909).

Stephen's family had belonged to the Clapham Sect, the early 19th-century group of mainly evangelical Christian social reformers. At his father's house, he saw a good deal of the Macaulays, James Spedding, Sir Henry Taylor and Nassau Senior. Leslie Stephen was educated at Eton College, King's College London and Trinity Hall, Cambridge, where he graduated B.A. (20th wrangler) in 1854 and M.A. in 1857. He was elected a fellow of Trinity Hall in 1854 and became a junior tutor in 1856.

In 1859, Stephen was ordained, but his study of philosophy, together with his perception of the religious controversies surrounding the publication of On the Origin of Species (1859) by Charles Darwin, led to his losing his faith in 1862, and in 1864 he resigned from his positions at Cambridge, and moved to London. He recounted some of his experiences in a chapter in his Life of Fawcett as well as in some less formal Sketches from Cambridge: By a Don (1865). These sketches were reprinted from The Pall Mall Gazette, to the proprietor of which, George Murray Smith, he had been introduced by his brother.

=== Marriage ===
==== (1) Harriet (Minny) Thackeray 1867–1875 ====
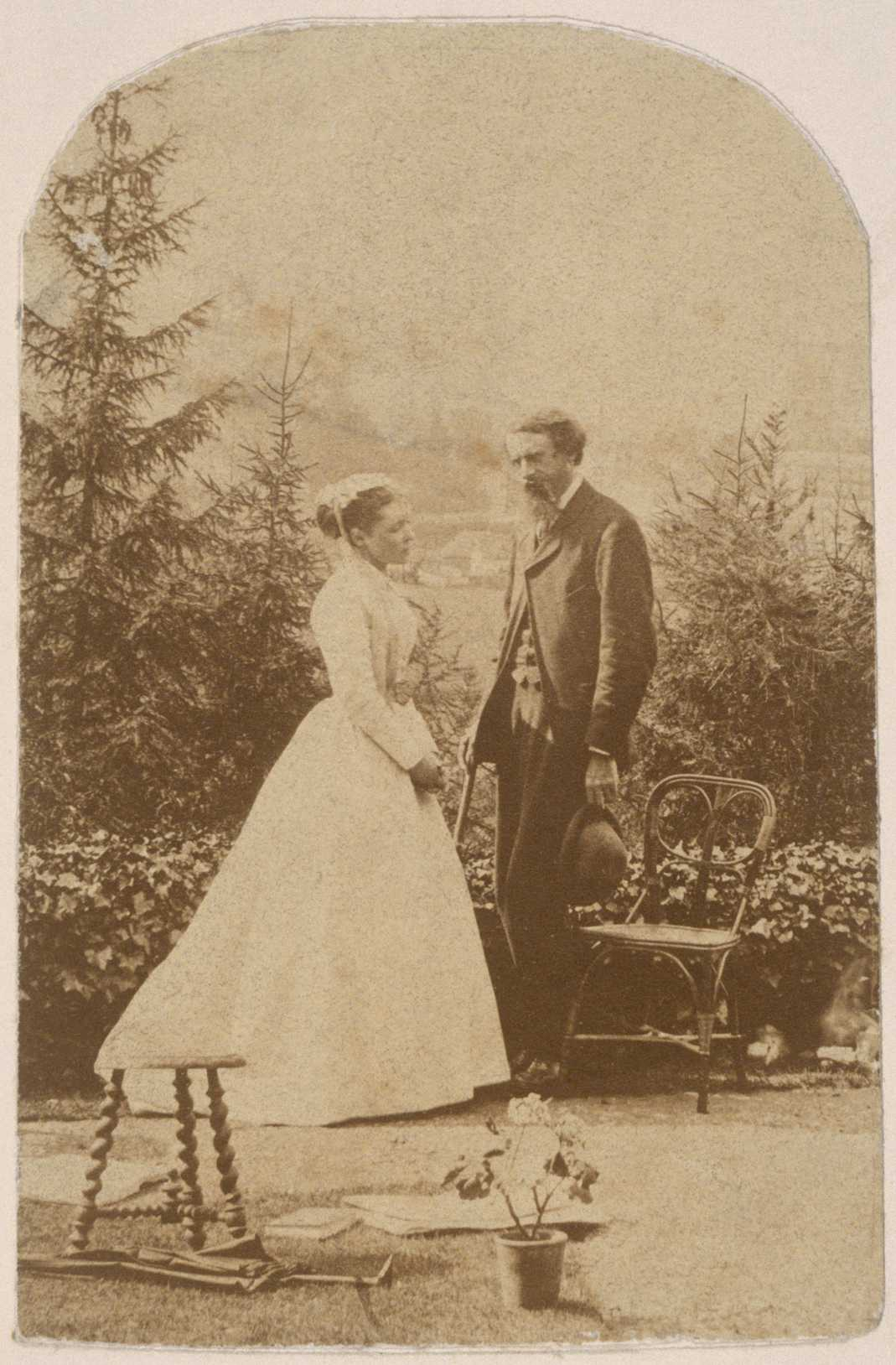
Harriet and Leslie Stephen, 1867

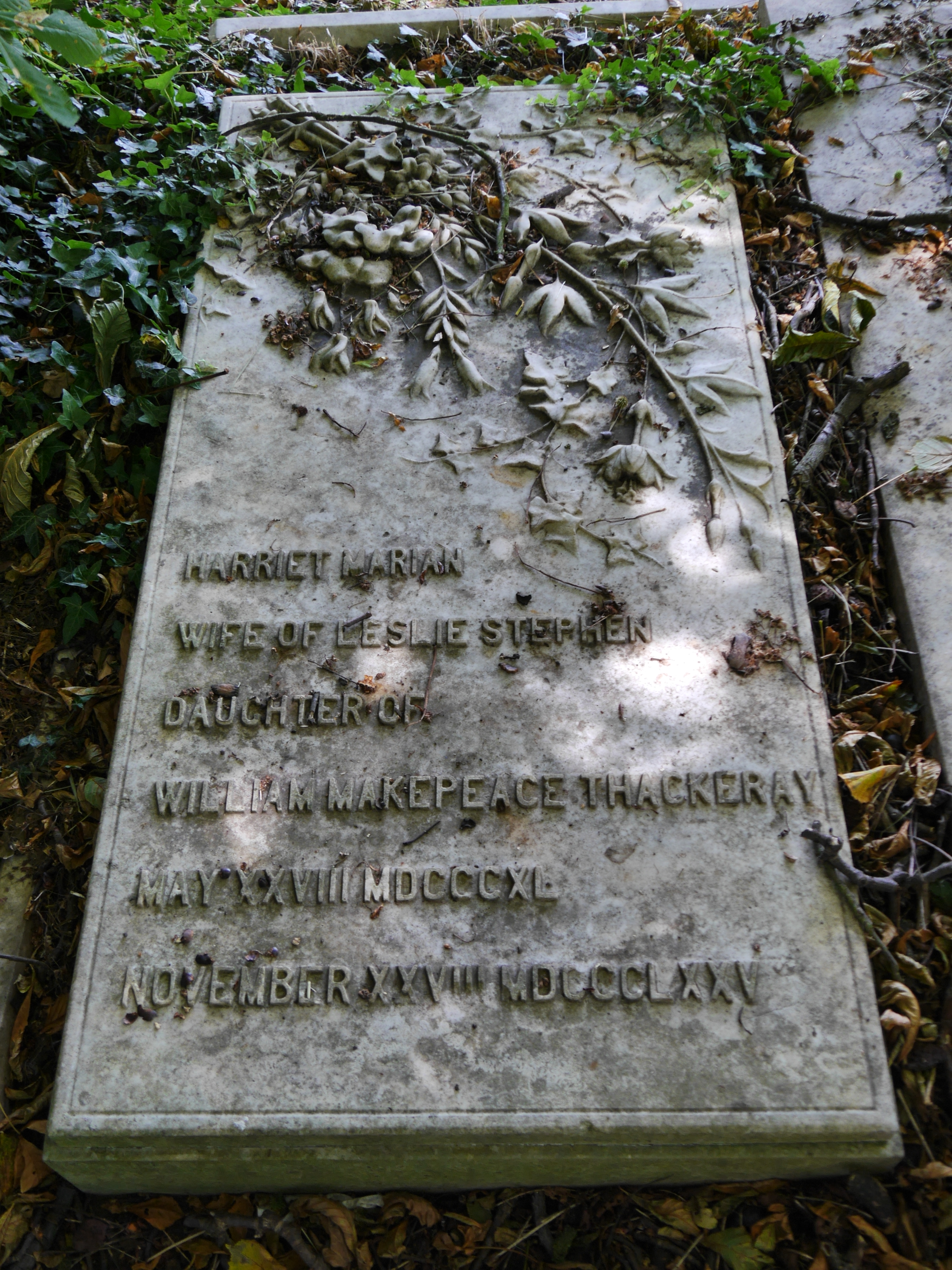
Harriet's grave, Kensal Green Cemetery

The family connections included those of William Makepeace Thackeray. His brother, Fitzjames had been a friend of Thackeray's and assisted in the disposition of his estate when he died in 1863. His sister Caroline met Thackeray's daughters, Anny (1837–1919) and Minny (1840–1875) when they were mutual guests of Julia Margaret Cameron (of whom, see later). This led to an invitation to visit from Leslie Stephen's mother, Lady Stephen, where the sisters met him. They also met at George Murray Smith's house at Hampstead. Minny and Leslie became engaged on 4 December 1866 and married on 19 June 1867.

After the wedding, they travelled to the Swiss Alps and Northern Italy, and on return to England lived at the Thackeray sisters' home at 16 Onslow Gardens with Anny, who was a novelist. In the spring of 1868 Minny miscarried but recovered sufficiently for the couple to tour the eastern United States. Minny miscarried again in 1869, but became pregnant again in 1870 and on 7 December gave birth to their daughter, Laura Makepeace Stephen (1870–1945). Laura was premature, weighing three pounds. In March 1873, Thackeray and the Stephens moved to 8 Southwell Gardens. The couple travelled extensively, and by the summer of 1875, Minny was pregnant again, but this time in poor health. She went to the Alps and came back slightly better, but got back pains by October–November. On the evening of 27 November, she went to bed, fell into convulsions, and died the following day of eclampsia.

After Minny's death, Leslie Stephen continued to live with Anny, but they moved to 11 Hyde Park Gate South in 1876, next door to her widowed friend and collaborator, Julia Duckworth. Leslie Stephen and his daughter were also cared for by his sister, the writer Caroline Emelia Stephen, although Leslie described her as "Silly Milly" and her books as "little works". Meanwhile, Anny was falling in love with her younger cousin Richmond Ritchie, to Leslie Stephen's consternation. Ritchie became a constant visitor and they became engaged in May 1877 and were married on 2 August. At the same time, Leslie Stephen was seeing more and more of Julia Duckworth.

==== (2) Julia Duckworth 1878–1895 ====
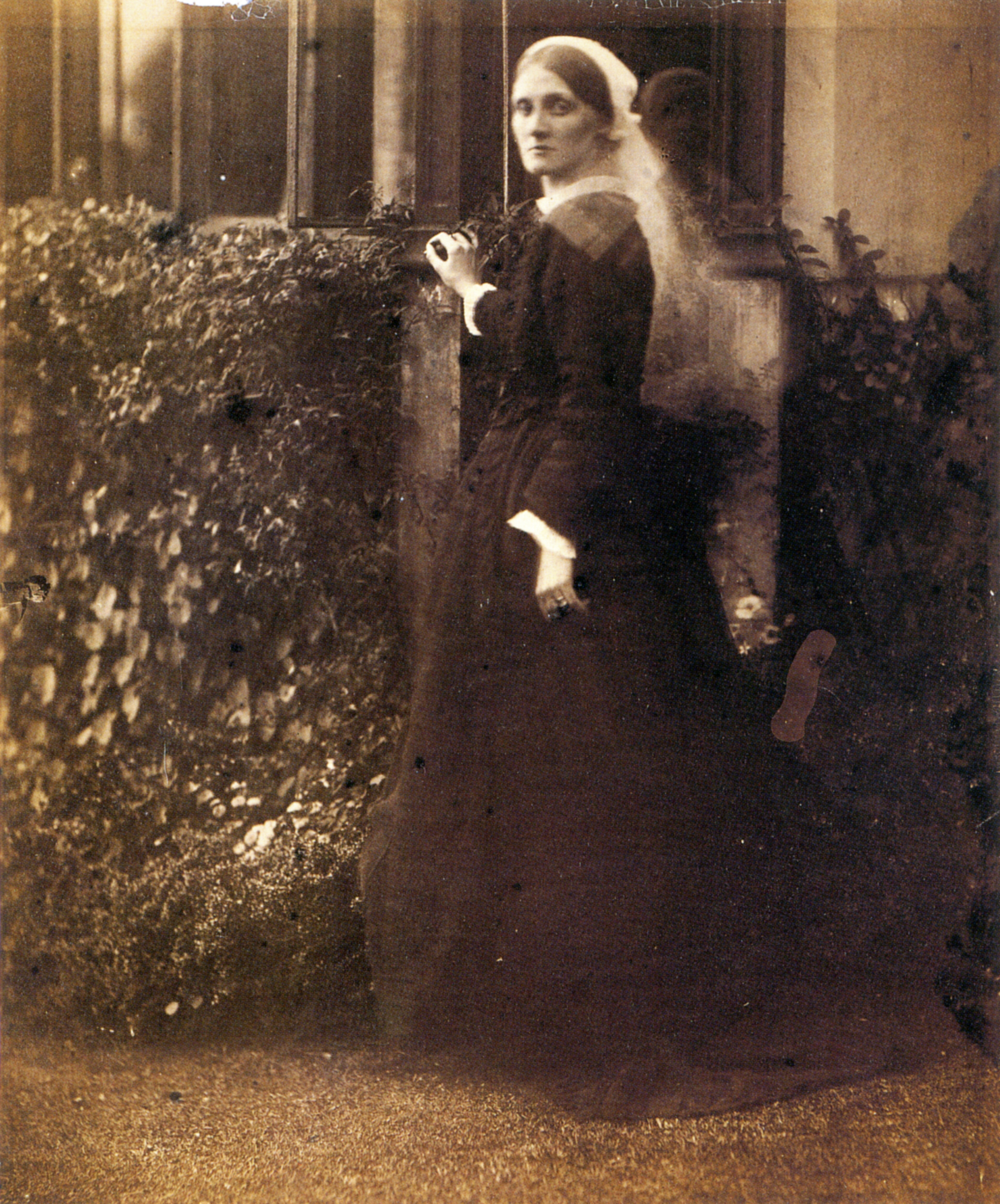
Julia Duckworth by Julia Margaret Cameron, 1872

Stephen's second marriage was to Julia Prinsep Duckworth (née Jackson, 1846–1895). Julia had been born in India and after returning to England she became a model for Pre-Raphaelite painters such as Edward Burne-Jones. In 1867, she had married Herbert Duckworth (1833–1870) by whom she had three children prior to his death in 1870.

Stephen and Julia Duckworth were married on 26 March 1878. They had four children:

- Vanessa (1879–1961), who married Clive Bell
- Thoby (1880–1906)
- Virginia (1882–1941), who married Leonard Woolf
- Adrian (1883–1948)

In May 1895, Julia died of influenza, leaving her husband with four young children aged 11 to 15 (her children by her first marriage being adults by then).

=== Career ===
In the 1850s, Stephen and his brother James were invited by Frederick Denison Maurice to lecture at The Working Men's College. Leslie Stephen became a member of the college's governing College Corporation.

Stephen was an honorary fellow of Trinity Hall, Cambridge, and received the honorary degree Doctor of Letters (D.Litt.) from the University of Cambridge and from the University of Oxford (November 1901). While at Cambridge, Stephen became an Anglican clergyman. In 1865, having renounced his religious beliefs, and after a visit to the United States two years earlier, where he had formed lasting friendships with Oliver Wendell Holmes Jr., James Russell Lowell and Charles Eliot Norton, he settled in London and became a journalist, eventually editing The Cornhill Magazine in 1871 where R. L. Stevenson, Thomas Hardy, W. E. Norris, Henry James, and James Payn figured among his contributors.

In his spare time, Stephen participated in athletics and mountaineering. He also contributed to the Saturday Review, Fraser, Macmillan, the Fortnightly, and other periodicals. He was already known as a climber, as a contributor to Peaks, Passes and Glaciers (1862), and as one of the earliest presidents of the Alpine Club, when, in 1871, in commemoration of his own first ascents in the Alps, he published The Playground of Europe, which immediately became a mountaineering classic, drawing—together with Whymper's Scrambles Amongst the Alps — successive generations of its readers to the Alps.

During the eleven years of Stephen's editorship, in addition to three volumes of critical studies, he made two valuable contributions to philosophical history and theory. The first was The History of English Thought in the Eighteenth Century (1876 and 1881). This work was generally recognised as an important addition to philosophical literature and led immediately to Stephen's election at the Athenaeum Club in 1877. The second was The Science of Ethics (1882). It was extensively adopted as a textbook on the subject and made him the best-known proponent of evolutionary ethics in late-nineteenth-century Britain. He was elected a member of the American Antiquarian Society in 1901.

Stephen also served as the first editor (1885–91) of the Dictionary of National Biography. He was appointed a Knight Commander of the Order of the Bath (KCB) in the 1902 Coronation Honours list published on 26 June 1902.

=== Beliefs ===
As an adult, Stephen was an agnostic atheist who wrote extensively about his views. In Social Rights and Duties (1896), he explained how he came to abandon the faith of his parents: "When I ceased to accept the teaching of my youth, it was not so much a process of giving up beliefs as of discovering that I never really believed." His second wife, Julia, was similarly activist in her writings on agnosticism.

Stephen advocated for more people of this view to claim the label "agnostic" for themselves, eschewing the harder associations of the unadorned term "atheist", reflecting the fact that no one who claims disbelief in gods does so on the basis of professing absolute knowledge about the universe. He concluded his essay "An Agnostic's Apology" with a reply to religious critics who hold atheists and agnostics in contempt:

"Til then, we shall be content to admit openly what you whisper under your breath or hide in technical jargon, that the ancient secret is secret still; that man knows nothing of the Infinite and Absolute; and that, knowing nothing, he had better not be dogmatic about his ignorance. And, meanwhile, we will endeavour to be as charitable as possible, and whilst you trumpet forth officially your contempt for our skepticism, we will at least try to believe that you are imposed upon by your own bluster."

— Leslie Stephen

Stephen was very involved in the organised Ethical movement. He served multiple terms as President of the West London Ethical Society (part of the Union of Ethical Societies). He gave numerous addresses and lectures to the ethical society during his tenure as president, which are collected at length across multiple volumes of writings. He was an active organiser in the movement, and in one lecture, entitled "The aims of ethical societies", set about the task of defining the broader social purpose which animated the wider Ethical movement at that time.

=== Mountaineering ===
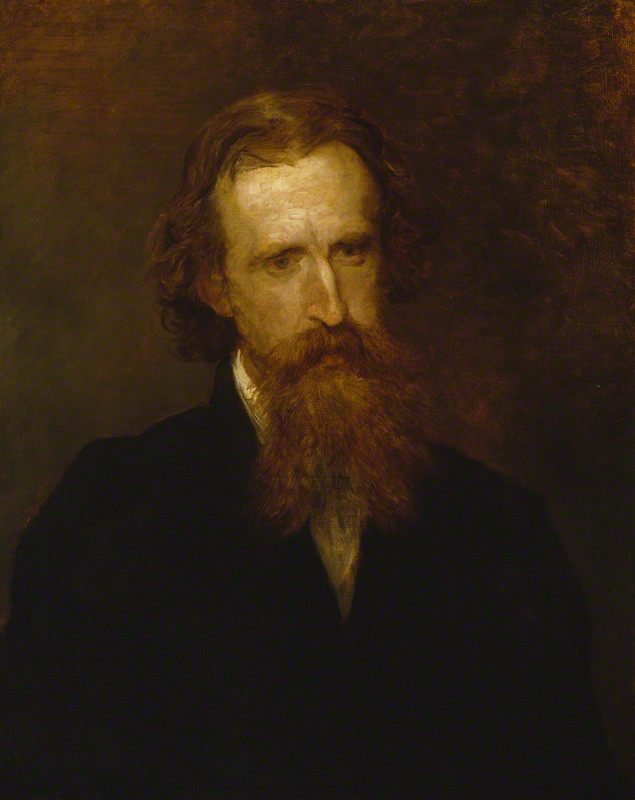
Leslie Stephen painted by George Frederic Watts, 1878.

Stephen was one of the most prominent figures in the golden age of alpinism (the period between Wills's ascent of the Wetterhorn in 1854 and Whymper's ascent of the Matterhorn in 1865) during which many major alpine peaks saw their first ascents. Joining the Alpine Club in 1857 (the year of its formation), Stephen made the first ascent, usually in the company of his favourite Swiss guide Melchior Anderegg, of the following peaks:

- Wildstrubel – 11 September 1858 with T. W. Hinchliff and Melchior Anderegg
- Bietschhorn – 13 August 1859 with Anton Siegen, Johann Siegen and Joseph Ebener
- Rimpfischhorn – 9 September 1859 with Robert Living, Melchior Anderegg and Johann Zumtaugwald
- Alphubel – 9 August 1860 with T. W. Hinchliff, Melchior Anderegg and Peter Perren
- Blüemlisalphorn – 27 August 1860 with Robert Living, Melchior Anderegg, F. Ogi, P. Simond and J. K. Stone
- Schreckhorn – 16 August 1861 with Ulrich Kaufmann, Christian Michel and Peter Michel
- Jungfraujoch – July 1862 with H. B. George, Henry Morgan, F. J. Hardy, Living, and Moore.
- Monte Disgrazia – 23 August 1862 with E. S. Kennedy, Thomas Cox and Melchior Anderegg
- Zinalrothorn – 22 August 1864 with Florence Crauford Grove, Jakob Anderegg and Melchior Anderegg
- Mont Mallet – 4 September 1871 with G. Loppe, F. A. Wallroth, Melchior Anderegg, Ch. and A. Tournier

Stephen was President of the Alpine Club from 1865 to 1868 and edited the Alpine Journal, 1868–1872.

== List of selected publications ==
- The Poll Degree from a Third Point of View (1863).
- The "Times" on the American War: A Historical Study (1865).
- Sketches from Cambridge (1865).
- The Playground of Europe (1871).
- Essays on Free Thinking and Plain Speaking (1873).
- Hours in a Library (3 vols., 1874–1879).
- The History of English Thought in the Eighteenth Century (volume I; volume II, 1876).
- Samuel Johnson (1878).
- Swift (1882).
- The Science of Ethics (1882).
- Life of Henry Fawcett (1885).
- An Agnostic's Apology and Other Essays (London: Smith, Elder and Company, 1893).
- Sir Victor Brooke, Sportsman and Naturalist (1894).
- The Life of Sir James Fitzjames Stephen, Bart., K.C.S.I. (1895).
- Social Rights and Duties, William Swan Sonnenschein (1896).
- Studies of a Biographer (4 volumes, 1898–1902).
- The English Utilitarians (1900).
- George Eliot (London: Macmillan, 1902).
- English Literature and Society in the Eighteenth Century (Ford Lectures) (London: Duckworth and Company, 1903, 1904).
- Hobbes (1904).
- Stephen, Leslie (1977). Bell, Alan S (ed.). Sir Leslie Stephen's Mausoleum Book. Clarendon Press. ISBN 978-0-19-812084-1.

== Death ==
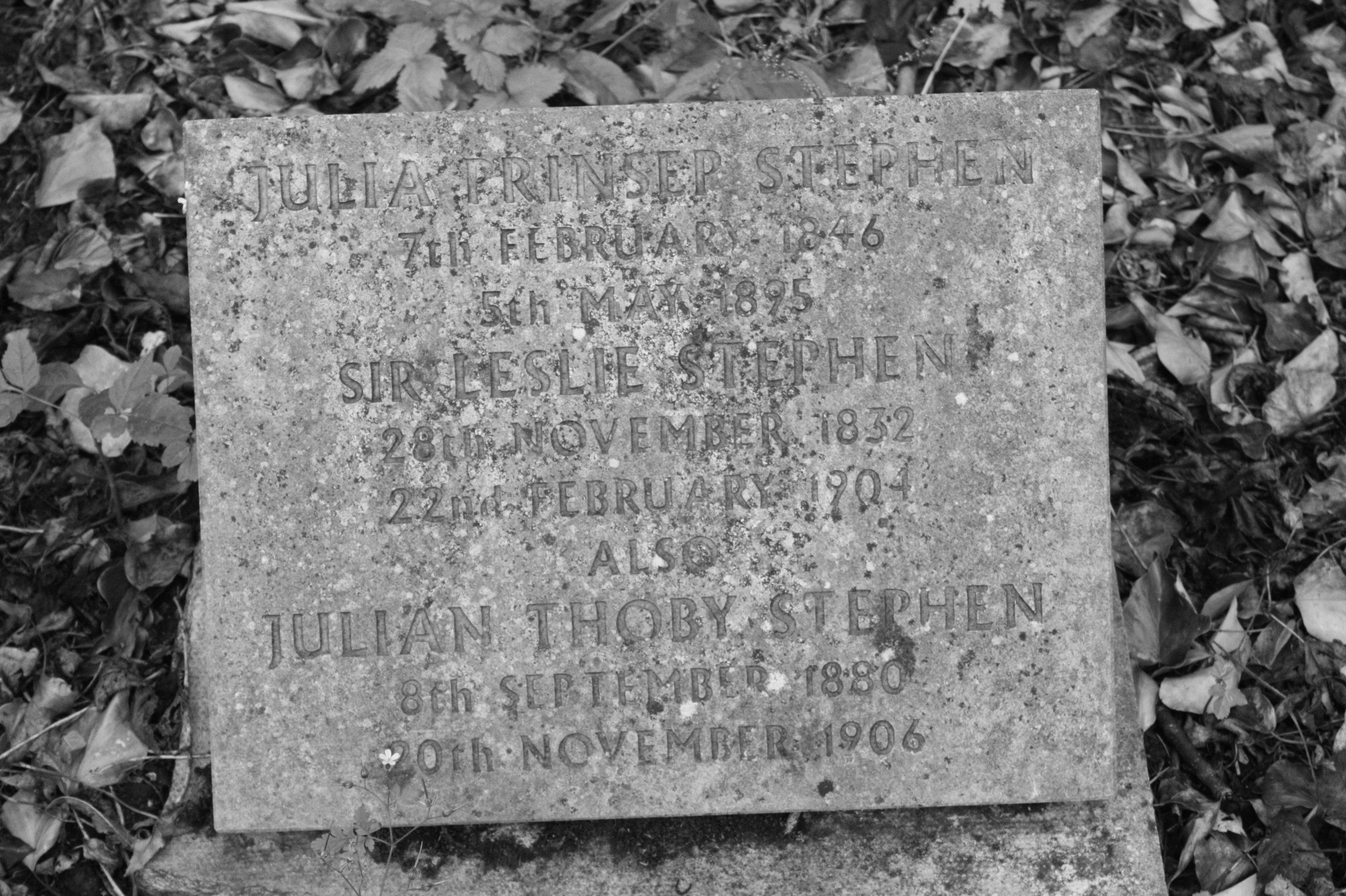
Leslie Stephen's grave, Highgate Cemetery

Stephen died in Kensington and is buried in the eastern section of Highgate Cemetery in the raised section alongside the northern path. His daughter, Virginia Woolf, was badly affected by his death and she was cared for by his sister, Caroline. Woolf in 1927 created a detailed psychological portrait of him in the fictional character of Mr. Ramsay in her classic novel, To the Lighthouse, (as well as of her mother as Mrs. Ramsay). (Ref: The Diaries and Letters of Virginia Woolf) His probate is worded: STEPHEN sir Leslie of 22 Hyde Park-gate Middlesex K.C.B. probate London 23 March to George Herbert Duckworth and Gerald de L'Etang Duckworth esquires Effects £15715 6s. 6d.

To honour his memory, Stephen's friends held a lecture in 1907 at the University of Cambridge, which has been held bi-annually as the Leslie Stephen Lecture since. His friends endowed that it be held with the specification that it be on "some literary subject, including therein criticism, biography and ethics."

== Family tree ==
For family trees of the Stephens, Thackerays and Jacksons, see Bicknell (1996a) and Bloom and Maynard (1994).

Stephen family tree

Robert Wilberforce; 1728–1768 | Elizabeth Bird; 1730–1798
m.(1) 1783; Anna Stent; 1758–1790 | James Stephen; 1758–1832 | m.(2) 1800; Sarah Wilberforce; 1757–1816 | William Wilberforce; 1759–1833 | John Venn; 1759–1813 | m. 1789; Katherine King; 1760–1803
William Makepeace Thackeray; 1811–1863 | m. 1836; Isabella Gethin Shawe; 1816–1893 | James; 1789–1859 | 1814; Jane Catherine Venn; 1793–1875
m. 1877; Richmond Ritchie | Annie; 1837–1919 | m.(1); Harriet Marian Thackeray; 1840–1875 | Leslie; 1832−1904 | m.(2) 1878; Julia Duckworth; 1846–1895 | James Fitzjames; 1829–1894 | Caroline; 1834–1909
Laura; 1870–1945 | 4 see Julia Stephen

== Bibliography ==
- Annan, Baron Noël Gilroy Annan (1984). Leslie Stephen: the Godless Victorian. Random House. ISBN 978-0-394-53061-1.
- Bell, Alan (24 May 2012). "Stephen, Sir Leslie (1832–1904)". Oxford Dictionary of National Biography (online ed.). Oxford University Press. doi:10.1093/ref:odnb/36271. (Subscription, Wikipedia Library access or UK public library membership required.)
- Bell, Quentin (1972). Virginia Woolf: A Biography. Harcourt Brace Jovanovich. ISBN 978-0-15-693580-7.
- Bicknell, John W, ed. (1996a). Selected Letters of Leslie Stephen: Volume 1. 1864-1882. Basingstoke: Macmillan. ISBN 9781349248872.
- Bicknell, John W, ed. (1996b). Selected Letters of Leslie Stephen: Volume 2. 1882-1904. Ohio State University Press. ISBN 978-0-8142-0691-1.
- Broughton, Trev Lynn (2004). Men of Letters, Writing Lives. Routledge. ISBN 978-1-134-89156-6.
- Harrison, Frederic (1908). "Sir Leslie Stephen." In: Realities and Ideals. London: Macmillan & Co.
- Hutton, Richard Holt (1908). "Mr. Leslie Stephen and the Scepticism of Believers." In: Criticism on Contemporary Thought and Thinkers. London: Macmillan and Co.
- Hyman, Virginia R. (1980). "Concealment and Disclosure in Sir Leslie Stephen's "Mausoleum Book"". Biography. 3 (2): 121–131. doi:10.1353/bio.2010.0819. JSTOR 23538993. PMID 11616677. S2CID 43408022.
- Luebering, J. E. (21 December 2006). "Sir Leslie Stephen". Encyclopædia Britannica.
- MacCarthy, Desmond (1937). Leslie Stephen: The Leslie Stephen Lecture delivered before the University of Cambridge on 27 May 1937. CUP Archive.
- Maitland, Frederic William (1906). The life and letters of Leslie Stephen. London: Duckworth & Co..
- Stephen, Leslie (1977). Bell, Alan S (ed.). Sir Leslie Stephen's Mausoleum Book. Clarendon Press. ISBN 978-0-19-812084-1.
- Stephen, Leslie, ed. (1886). Dictionary of National Biography. vol. VIII Burton Cantwell. London: Elder, Smith & Co. (see also Dictionary of National Biography)
- Shaw, Alan George Lewers (3 January 2008). "Stephen, Sir James (1789–1859)". Oxford Dictionary of National Biography (online ed.). Oxford University Press. doi:10.1093/ref:odnb/26374. (Subscription, Wikipedia Library access or UK public library membership required.)
- Venn, John (2012) [1904 Macmillan, London]. Annals of a Clerical Family: Being Some Account of the Family and Descendants of William Venn, Vicar of Otterton, Devon, 1600–1621. Cambridge University Press. ISBN 978-1-108-04492-9. also Internet archive

=== Websites ===
- Kukil, Karen V. (2011). "Leslie Stephen's Photograph Album". Northampton, Massachusetts: Smith College.
- "Julia Prinsep Stephen (1846–1895): wife/mother/writer/volunteer". Woolf, Creativity and Madness. Smith College. 22 March 2011. Family tree
- "Stephen, Leslie (STFN850L)". A Cambridge Alumni Database. University of Cambridge.
- "Find a will. Index to wills and administrations (1858–1995)". Calendars of the Grants of Probate and Letters of Administration. The National Archives.
- Virginia Woolf (1922). "To the Lighthouse"

=== Anne Thackeray Ritchie ===
- Bloom, Abigail Burnham; Maynard, John, eds. (1994). Anne Thackeray Ritchie: Journals and Letters. Studies in Victorian Life and Literature. Columbus, Ohio: Ohio State University Press. ISBN 978-0-8142-0638-6. LCCN 94015018. OCLC 30319274. OL 1090781M.
- Gérin, Winifred (1981). Anne Thackeray Ritchie: a biography. Oxford: Oxford U.P. ISBN 9780198126645.
- Garnett, Henrietta (2004). Anny: A Life of Anny Thackeray Ritchie. London: Chatto & Windus. ISBN 0-7011-7129-4.
