= Blanche Warre-Cornish =

English novelist and biographer (1848–1922)

Blanche Warre-Cornish (née Ritchie; 5 July 1848 – 9 August 1922), also known as Mrs Cornish, was an English writer and conversationalist, celebrated for the "pregnant and startling irrelevancies" of her discourse. She edited some reminiscences of her cousin, the novelist William Thackeray.

== Family ==
Blanche was born in Calcutta, India. Her father was William Ritchie, Advocate-General of Bengal, and her brother Sir Richmond Ritchie, who spent most of his working life in the Indian Office. In 1866, aged 18, she married Francis Warre-Cornish, a master at Eton College and ultimately Vice-Provost of the school. Their several children included the writer Mary MacCarthy and Cecilia Fisher, who married William Wordsworth Fisher, later an admiral. Blanche Warre-Cornish died in Kensington, London.

== Works ==
Warre-Cornish's published works included the novels Alcestis (1873) and Northam Cloisters (1882, sometimes misattributed to William Hamilton Maxwell). She also wrote a memoir of Robert Hugh Benson and edited some biographical reminiscences of her cousin, William Thackeray.

However, she was noted most of all for her conversation, which engaged and occasionally alarmed generations of Eton schoolboys. Some of her remarks were collected by Logan Pearsall Smith and printed privately in 1935 as Cornishiana. A second edition was printed in Cairo by the Press of the Institut Français d'Archéologie Orientale in 1947 and reprinted in 1999 by Stone Trough Books.

A. C. Benson described her in a letter to Geoffrey Madan:

Mrs C reflectively with eyes half closed, said to an amazed table, "Whenever I am depressed, I take refuge in three thoughts (1) that I come of British parentage, (2) that I pursue my avocations on land and not at sea (3) that I was born in wedlock"
