= William Ritchie (barrister) =

British lawyer in India (1817–1862)

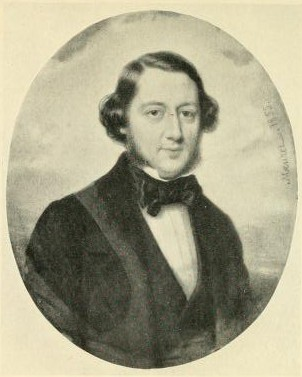
William Ritchie, 1855 portrait

William Ritchie (1817–1862) was an English barrister, Advocate-General of Bengal from 1855 to 1862.

== Life ==
William Ritchie was born at Southampton Row, London in 1817. His father John Ritchie was a Scottish-born merchant of Baltimore. His mother Charlotte Thackeray was aunt to William Makepeace Thackeray. The Thackeray family from Hadley had a long association with India, and her nephew was the novelist.

Ritchie was educated at Eton College 1829 to 1835, and Trinity College, Cambridge, where he matriculated in 1835, graduating B.A. in 1839 and M.A. in 1842. After Cambridge, he entered the Inner Temple. He lived with his family in Albany Street, London while reading for the Bar. His father John was the director of a bank that failed in November 1841, causing the Ritchie family to leave for the continent, to escape creditors.

Ritchie was called to the bar in 1842. He looked to the legal system of British India where he could earn an immediate income, rather than staying in London hoping for briefs. He built up a practice at the Calcutta Bar. He was appointed Advocate-General of Bengal in (1855?), also appointed the second Vice Chancellor of the University of Calcutta in 1859. William was appointed Legislative Member of the Council of the Governor-General of India in (1860?). William held these offices until his death in Calcutta on 22 March 1862.

Ritchie had a popular reputation for his gentle, amiable, overly-polite manner and his honourable character. This reputation earned him the nickname "Gentleman Ritchie" at Cambridge.

== Family ==
Ritchie proposed to Augusta Trimmer on 28 August 1842 before sailing for India on 1 September on the Prince of Wales. After he made a name for himself at the bar in Calcutta. Augusta joined him there in 1845. They were married on 4 December at St. John's Church, and had eight children. There were sons:

- William Irvine Ritchie (1850–1903) of the Education Office
- John Gerald Ritchie (1853–1921) of the Indian Civil Service
- Richmond Ritchie (1854–1912)
- Edward Duguid Ritchie (1859–1912), physician.

The daughters were:

- Augusta Charlotte (1847–1910), the eldest, married Douglas William Freshfield;
- Emily (1851–1932), unmarried.
- Blanche, married Francis Warre-Cornish.
- Elinor, married Herbert Paul.
