= Anne Thackeray Ritchie =

English writer (1837–1919)

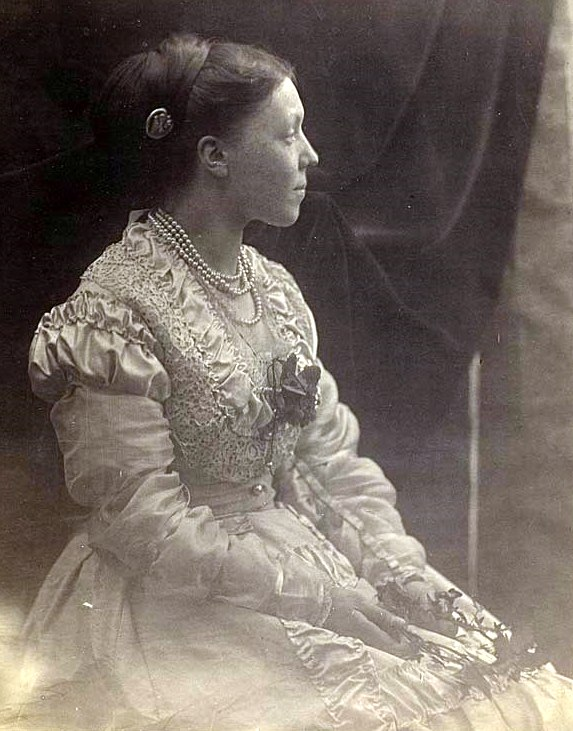
- Portrait of Anne Thackeray Ritchie, 1870
- Born: Anne Isabella Thackeray; 9 June 1837; London, England
- Died: 26 February 1919 (aged 81); Freshwater, England
- Occupation: Writer
- Spouse: Richmond Ritchie (m. 1877; died 1912)
- Children: 2
- Parents: William Makepeace Thackeray (father); Isabella Gethin Shawe (mother)
- Relatives: Harriet Stephen (sister)

Signature
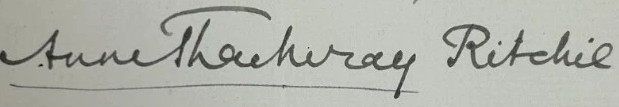

Anne Isabella, Lady Ritchie (née Thackeray; 9 June 1837 – 26 February 1919) was an English writer and the eldest daughter of William Makepeace Thackeray. Her novels were well received during her lifetime, establishing her reputation in the literary world of late Victorian Britain. She is particularly remembered for her role in preserving her father's literary legacy and for short fiction that reworked fairy tales in Victorian settings.

== Life ==
Anne Isabella Thackeray was born in London, the eldest daughter of William Makepeace Thackeray and his wife Isabella Gethin Shawe (1816–1894). She had two younger sisters: Jane, born in July 1838, who died in March 1839 at eight months, and Harriet Marian, known as "Minny" (1840–1875), who married Leslie Stephen in 1867. Anne, whom her father called Anny, spent her childhood in France and England. She and Minny were accompanied for a time by the future poet Anne Evans.

In 1877, she married her cousin Richmond Ritchie, who was 17 years younger than her. They had two children, Hester and Billy. When Richmond was knighted in 1907, Anne became Lady Ritchie. She was a step-aunt of Virginia Woolf, who wrote an obituary of her for The Times Literary Supplement. She is also thought to have inspired the character of Mrs Hilbery in Woolf's novel Night and Day.

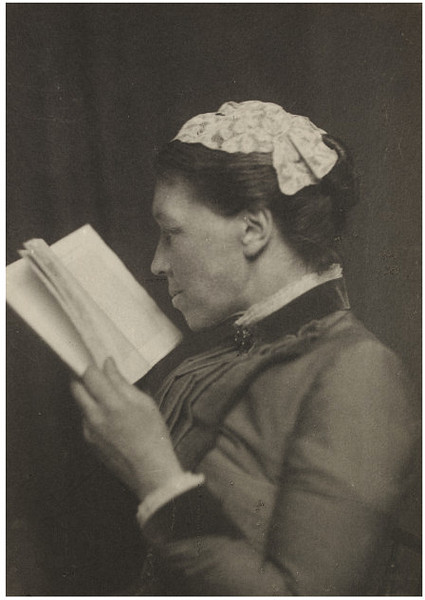
Lady Ritchie, photographed around 1890

== Literary career ==
Ritchie made her literary debut in 1860 with "Little Scholars", an essay published anonymously in Cornhill Magazine, which was then edited by her father. He encouraged her writing, and she went on to contribute short stories and serialised novels to the magazine. The success of The Story of Elizabeth, published in book form in 1863, helped her establish a literary reputation of her own.

Her fiction explored family relationships, women's choices and the expectations surrounding marriage in Victorian society. Through domestic situations and female characters, she examined gender inequality and social conventions, often without openly rejecting those conventions. Literary critics have identified in her short fiction a cautious challenge to prevailing ideas about marriage and domesticity. She also adapted familiar fairy tales, including Sleeping Beauty, Cinderella and Little Red Riding Hood, placing their stories in recognisably contemporary settings.

One of the earliest known English formulations of the proverb about teaching someone to fish appears in her novel Mrs. Dymond (1885): "if you give a man a fish he is hungry again in an hour. If you teach him to catch a fish you do him a good turn." The wording differs from the more familiar modern version, which contrasts feeding someone for a day with feeding them for a lifetime.

Ritchie's novels found readers beyond Britain and were praised by contemporaries including George Eliot. Over time, she increasingly turned from fiction to essays, literary reminiscences and biographical writing, with a particular interest in women writers. She also contributed introductions to works by other authors. For many years she hesitated to write about her father, who had expressed the wish that no biography of him should be written. She eventually prepared biographical introductions for editions of his collected works. Her work helped shape his posthumous reputation, even as her own fiction gradually fell out of print.

== Works ==
The following is a partial list.

=== Novels and longer fiction ===
- The Story of Elizabeth. London: Smith, Elder & Co. 1863.
- The Village on the Cliff. London: Smith, Elder & Co. 1867. The Village on the Cliff: With Other Stories and Sketches. Boston: Fields, Osgood & Co. 1869.
- Old Kensington. London: Smith, Elder & Co. 1873. Reprint. London: Smith, Elder & Co. 1875.
- Miss Angel. London: Smith, Elder & Co. 1875. Miss Angel and Fulham Lawn. London: Smith, Elder & Co. 1884.
- From an Island: A Story and Some Essays (PDF). Leipzig: Bernhard Tauchnitz. 1877. Its principal story is a semi-autobiographical novella
- Mrs. Dymond. London: Smith, Elder & Co. 1885. Mrs. Dymond: A Novel. New York: Harper & Brothers. 1885. Reprint. Leipzig: Bernhard Tauchnitz. 1886. Reprint. London: Smith, Elder & Co. 1890.

=== Short fiction and story collections ===
- Five Old Friends, and a Young Prince. London: Smith, Elder & Co. 1868. Five Old Friends. Leipzig: Bernhard Tauchnitz. 1875. A collection of fairy-tale adaptations
- To Esther, and Other Sketches. London: Smith, Elder & Co. 1869.
- Bluebeard's Keys, and Other Stories. London: Smith, Elder & Co. 1874. Reprint. London: Smith, Elder & Co. 1875. Reprint. London: Smith, Elder & Co. 1902.
- Out of the World and Other Tales. Leipzig: Bernhard Tauchnitz. 1876.
- Da Capo and Other Tales. Leipzig: Bernhard Tauchnitz. 1880.
- Miss Williamson's Divagations. London: Smith, Elder & Co. 1881.

=== Essays and biographies ===
- Toilers and Spinsters, and Other Essays. London: Smith, Elder & Co. 1874.
- Madame de Sévigné. Foreign Classics for English Readers. Edinburgh and London: William Blackwood & Sons. 1881. A biography with literary extracts
- A Book of Sibyls: Mrs. Barbauld, Miss Edgeworth, Mrs. Opie, Miss Austen. London: Smith, Elder & Co. 1883. Biographical essays on women writers of the late eighteenth and early nineteenth centuries
- Records of Tennyson, Ruskin and Browning. London: Macmillan & Co. 1892. Records of Tennyson, Ruskin, Browning. New York: Harper & Brothers. 1892.
- Chapters from Some Memoirs. London: Macmillan & Co. 1894. Chapters from Some Unwritten Memoirs (PDF). New York: Harper & Brothers. 1895. Reprint. Adamant Media Corporation. 1999. ISBN 0543920984.
- Ritchie, Anne Thackeray; Evans, Richardson (1894). Lord Amherst and the British Advance Eastwards to Burma. Rulers of India. Oxford: Clarendon Press.
- Blackstick Papers (PDF). London: Smith, Elder & Co. 1908. Reprint. New York: G. P. Putnam's Sons. 1908.
- From the Porch. London: Smith, Elder & Co. 1913.

=== Introductions and contributions to other works ===
- Introductory notes to The Orphan of Pimlico by William Makepeace Thackeray: The Orphan of Pimlico, and Other Sketches, Fragments and Drawings. London: Smith, Elder & Co. 1876.
- Preface to a collection by Anne Evans: Anne Evans: Poems and Music. London: C. Kegan Paul & Co. 1880.
- Preface to Cranford by Elizabeth Gaskell: Cranford. London: Macmillan & Co. 1891.
- Introduction to The Fairy Tales of Madame d'Aulnoy by Madame d'Aulnoy: The Fairy Tales of Madame d'Aulnoy, Newly Done into English. Translated by Annie Macdonell and Miss Lee. London: Lawrence & Bullen. 1892.
- Introduction to Our Village by Mary Russell Mitford: Our Village. London: Macmillan & Co. 1893. The introduction is also available through the Baldwin Library of Historical Children's Literature Digital Collection
- Reminiscences and text for Alfred, Lord Tennyson and His Friends: A Series of 25 Portraits and Frontispiece in Photogravure. London: T. Fisher Unwin. 1893.
- Introduction to Castle Rackrent and The Absentee by Maria Edgeworth: Castle Rackrent and The Absentee. London: Macmillan & Co. 1895.
- Introduction to Ormond by Maria Edgeworth: Ormond. London: Macmillan & Co. 1895.
- Introduction to Popular Tales by Maria Edgeworth: Popular Tales. London: Macmillan & Co. 1895.
- Introduction to Helen by Maria Edgeworth: Helen. London: Macmillan & Co. 1896.
- Introduction to Belinda by Maria Edgeworth: Belinda. London: Macmillan & Co. 1896.
- Introduction to The Parent's Assistant by Maria Edgeworth: The Parent's Assistant, or Stories for Children. London: Macmillan & Co. 1897.
- Biographical introductions to The Works of William Makepeace Thackeray. The Biographical Edition. Vol. I–XIII. London: Smith, Elder & Co. 1899. The Works of William Makepeace Thackeray. The Centenary Edition. Vol. I–XXVI. London: Smith, Elder & Co. 1910–1911.

=== Posthumous collections ===
- Emily Ritchie, ed. (1919). From Friend to Friend. London: John Murray.
- Hester Ritchie, ed. (1924). Letters of Anne Thackeray Ritchie: With Forty-two Additional Letters from Her Father, William Makepeace Thackeray. London: John Murray. Hester Ritchie, ed. (1924). Thackeray and His Daughter: The Letters and Journals of Anne Thackeray Ritchie, with Many Letters of William Makepeace Thackeray. New York: Harper & Brothers.
- Abigail Burnham Bloom; John Maynard, eds. (1994). Anne Thackeray Ritchie: Journals and Letters. Biographical commentary and notes by Lillian F. Shankman. Columbus: Ohio State University Press. ISBN 9780814206386.

=== Translations ===
- Le roman d'Élizabeth, suivi de Grace Darling et des Régates universitaires (in French). Translated by Étienne Marcel. 1868.
- Sur la falaise (in French). Translated by Étienne Marcel. Paris: Hachette. 1882.
- Manuela D'Amore, ed. (2018). La bella e la bestia (in Italian). Lugano: Agorà & Co. ISBN 9788889526224.

== See also ==
- Victorian literature
- William Makepeace Thackeray
