= Desmond MacCarthy =

British writer (1877–1952)

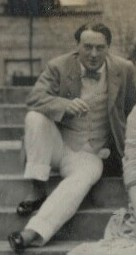
Desmond MacCarthy in 1912

Sir Charles Otto Desmond MacCarthy (20 May 1877 – 7 June 1952) was a British writer and literary and dramatic critic. He was a member of the Cambridge Apostles, the intellectual secret society, from 1896.

== Early life and education ==
The son of Charles Desmond MacCarthy, M.A., and a descendant of the last MacCarthy Chief of the Name and King of Desmond, MacCarthy was born on 20 May 1877 in Plymouth, Devon, and educated at Eton College and Trinity College, Cambridge. At Cambridge he got to know Lytton Strachey, Bertrand Russell and G. E. Moore.

== Career ==
A member of the Bloomsbury Group, MacCarthy also had a wider circle of friends, including Logan Pearsall Smith.

In 1903 he became a journalist, with moderate success.

For part of the First World War he worked in Naval Intelligence.

In 1917 he joined the New Statesman as a drama critic, and in 1920 became its literary editor. He wrote a weekly column under the pen-name "The Affable Hawk". During this time he recruited Cyril Connolly to the paper.

By 1928 he was losing interest in the New Statesman, and became the first editor of Life and Letters. Other periodicals he was associated with were New Quarterly and Eye Witness. MacCarthy became a literary critic for the Sunday Times, and several volumes of his collected criticism were published.

He was the author of the short ghost story "Pargiton and Harby", reprinted in the Fourth Fontana Book of Great Ghost Stories.

He was knighted in the 1951 New Year's Honours.

== Personal life ==
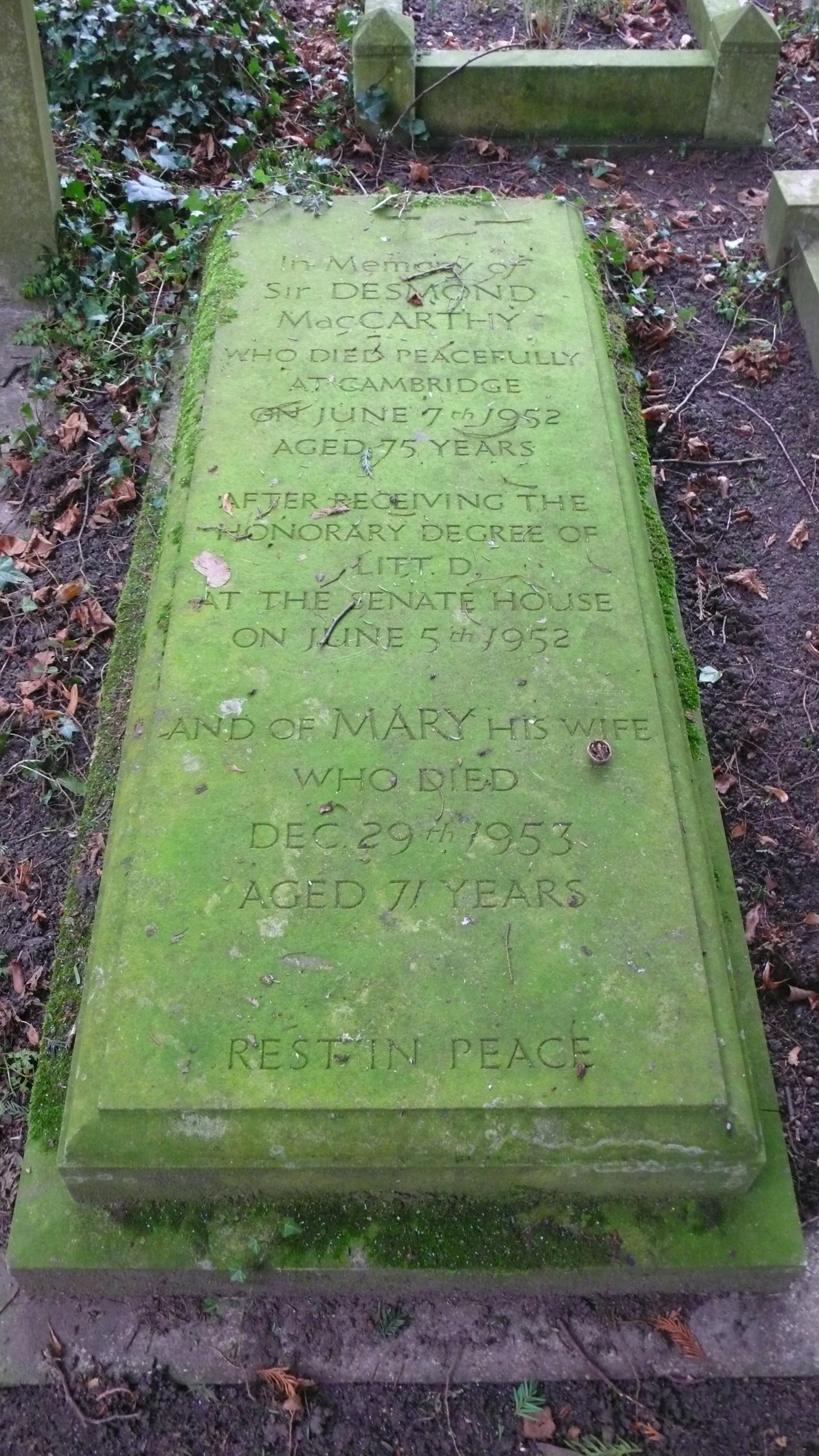
Grave of Desmond and Mary MacCarthy

In 1906, MacCarthy married Mary "Mollie" Warre-Cornish, daughter of Francis Warre Warre-Cornish. She was a respected literary figure in her own right. Her sister Cecilia married William Wordsworth Fisher. They had two sons, Michael and Dermod, and a daughter, Rachel, who married the literary historian Lord David Cecil; their son was the actor Jonathan Cecil.

He is buried with his wife at the Parish of the Ascension Burial Ground in Cambridge.

== Works ==
- The Court Theatre (1907)
- Portraits (1931)
- Drama (1940)
- Memories (1953)
- Humanities (1953)
- Theatre (1955)

== See also ==
- List of Bloomsbury Group people
