= Mary MacCarthy =

British writer (1882–1953)

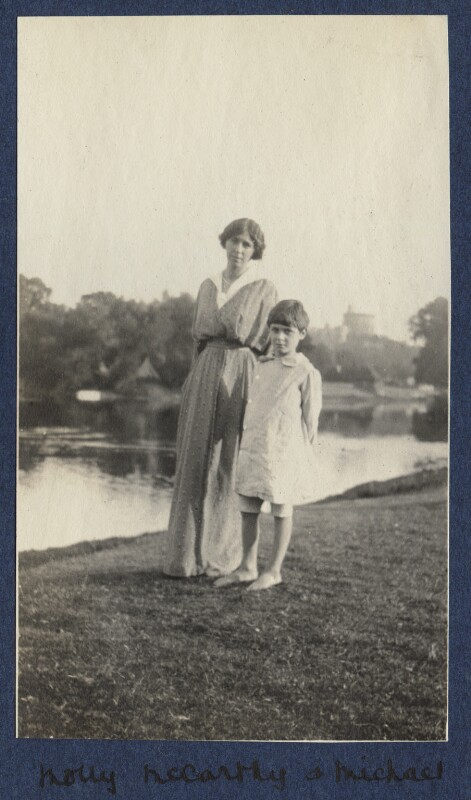
Mary MacCarthy with son Michael 1915

Mary, Lady MacCarthy (August 1882 – 29 December 1953) was a British writer known for her involvement in the "Bloomsbury Group". She was commonly called Molly.

== Life ==
She was born Mary Josepha Warre-Cornish in Lynton, Devon; the daughter of schoolmaster and man of letters Francis Warre Warre-Cornish by his wife, Blanche.

In 1906 she married the literary critic Sir Desmond MacCarthy, with whom she had two sons, Michael and Dermod, and a daughter, Rachel (later Lady David Cecil).

Though prevented by progressive hearing-loss from full participation in group conversation, she was active in the Bloomsbury group, as demonstrated by her formation of its Memoir group and Novel group, and by coining the term "Bloomsberries" to describe its members.

Her sister Cecilia married William Wordsworth Fisher later Admiral. Her daughter Rachel married the biographer David Cecil.

She died at Hampton, Middlesex, of heart failure, and is buried at the Parish of the Ascension Burial Ground in Cambridge, with her husband.

== Selected works ==
- A Pier and a Band (1918)
- A Nineteenth Century Childhood (1924)
- Fighting Fitzgerald and Other Papers (1930)
- Handicaps: Six Studies (1936)
- The Festival, Etc. (1937)

== Sources ==
- The Bloomsbury Group: A Collection of Memoirs and Commentary, ed. S. P. Rosenbaum (University of Toronto Press, revised edition, 1995).
- Clever Hearts: Desmond and Molly MacCarthy: A Biography, by Hugh and Mirabel Cecil (Gollancz, 1990).
