= Harriet Stephen =

Daughter of William Makepeace Thackeray and wife of Leslie Stephen (1840–1875)

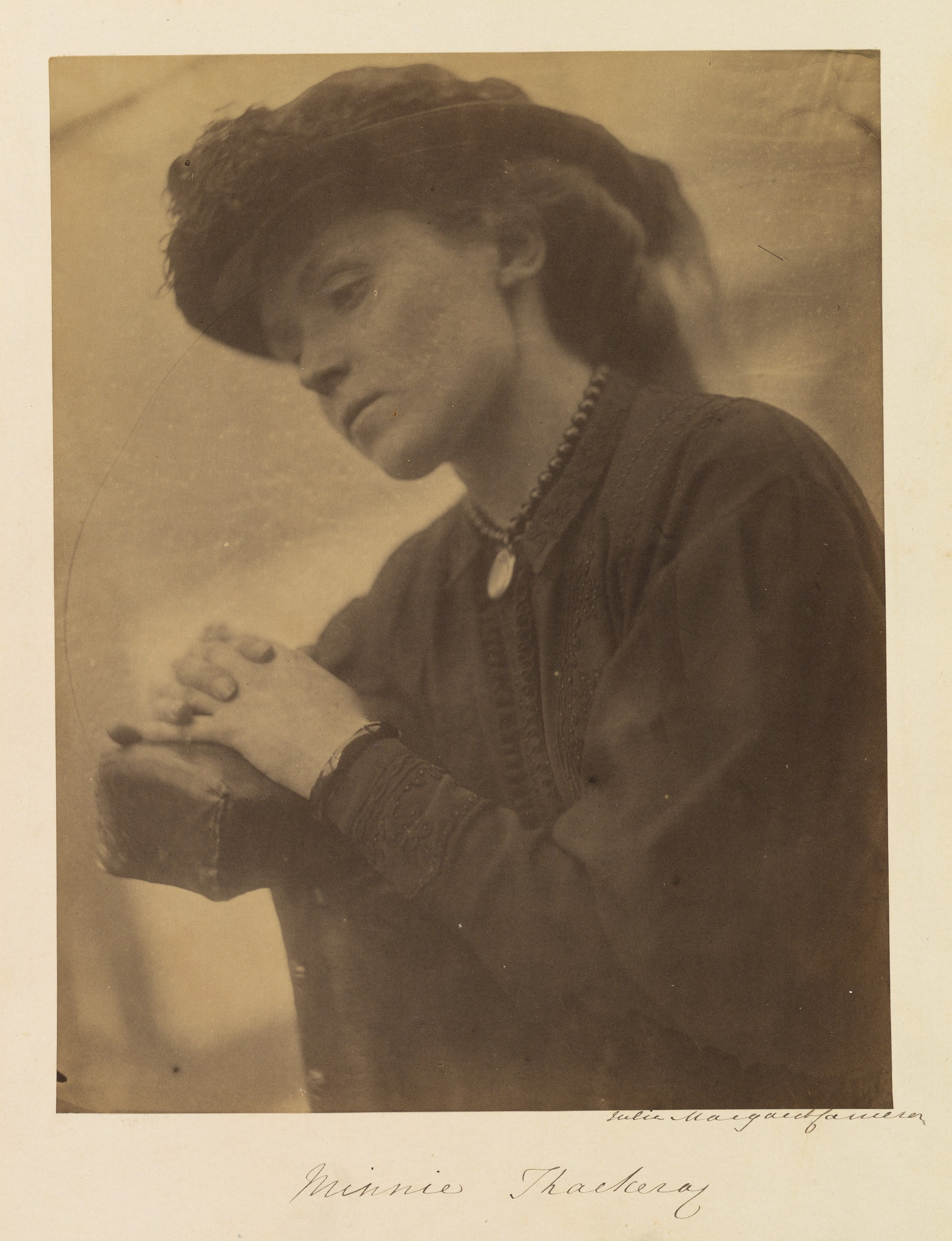
- Born: Harriet Marian Thackeray; 27 May 1840; London, England
- Died: 28 November 1875 (aged 35)
- Resting place: Kensal Green Cemetery
- Spouse: Leslie Stephen (m. 1867)
- Children: Laura Makepeace
- Parent(s): William Makepeace Thackeray; Isabella Gethin Shawe
- Relatives: Anne Thackeray Ritchie (sister)

Harriet Marian Stephen (née Thackeray; 27 May 1840 – 28 November 1875), was the wife of Leslie Stephen and what her father William Makepeace Thackeray called 'the balance wheel in the family'.

== Early life ==
Harriet Marian Thackeray, known as "Minny", was born in London on 27 May 1840, the third daughter of William Makepeace Thackeray and Isabella Gethin Creagh (née Shawe; 1816–1894). Following Minny's birth, her mother suffered from severe postpartum depression, which developed into serious, ongoing mental illness. As result, Isabella Thackeray was sent to a private asylum.

Minny and her sisters spent the following four years with William Thackeray's mother – a strict Calvinist – in Paris, after which they returned to live with him in London. Here, they were raised in a busy cultural atmosphere, exposed to the many literary guests of their father. The girls were educated by various governesses, visiting teachers, and foreign travel. Minny's sister, Anne Isabella, went on to be a noted writer, and Minny too was described as having 'a capacity for shrewd and witty commentary on the people she met.'

Minny's father described her at the age of 21 as being:

absurdly young for her age for she still likes playing with children and kittens and hates reading and is very shy tho' she does not show it and very clever tho' she does not do anything in particular and always helps me out of scrapes which I am getting into.

William Makepeace Thackeray died in 1863, and his daughters returned to live with their grandmother, who died a year later. Financially comfortable, Minny and Anne bought a house in London, where they shared household duties according to their particular talents.

== Marriage to Leslie Stephen ==
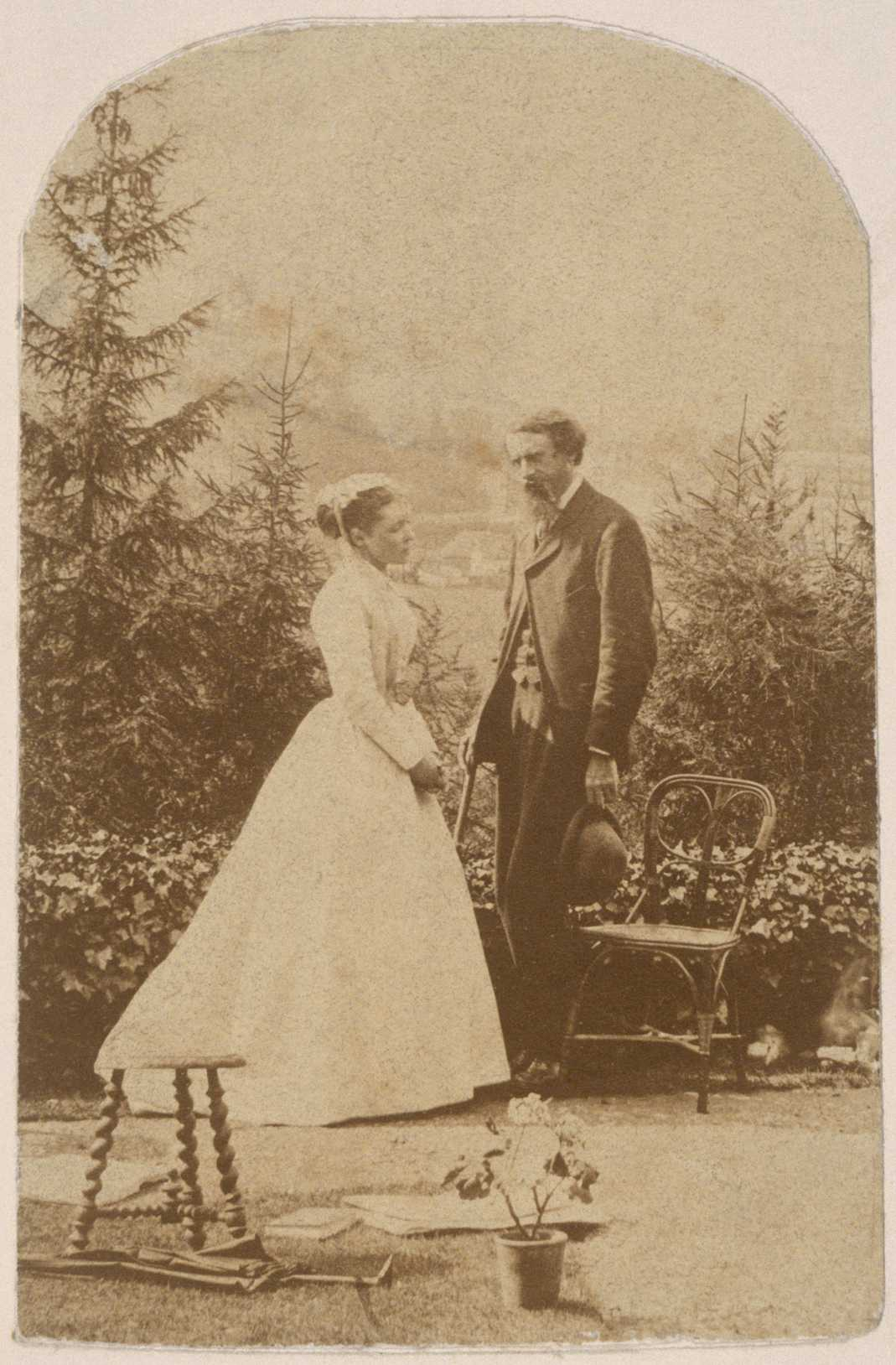
Minny and Leslie Stephen, 1867

Minny met Leslie Stephen at a dinner party held by his mother, Lady Stephen, with whom they were friends. Elizabeth Gaskell, also present, told Stephen later that she had foreseen their marriage from this early stage. Although the courtship was slow, the couple became engaged in December 1866, and married on 19 June the following year. Minny's sister, Anne, continued to live with the couple at the house she and Minny had bought together.

Minny and Leslie travelled to Switzerland for their honeymoon, where Minny described the Matterhorn by moonlight as looking

like a great hooky sort of gleaming ghost. I always think that it will come & poke its great hook nose into the windows.

The marriage was a happy one, and Minny shared her husband's interests, physical and intellectual. Stephen's more controversial opinions, for example on the matter of religion, she admired and supported, writing that she was

very thankful... that I belong to a man who can speak the bare truth & who tries to make others do the same.

After suffering two miscarriages, Minny gave birth to a daughter, Laura Makepeace (1870–1945) on 7 December 1870. Laura was born prematurely, referred to by Anne as 'a six months child.' Minny became pregnant again in the summer of 1875, but was taken ill on 27 November. She suffered convulsions and never regained consciousness, dying on 28 November, Leslie Stephen's birthday.

== Legacy ==
Minny was buried in Kensal Green Cemetery. Her daughter, Laura, was subsequently diagnosed as mentally handicapped, and placed in an institution by Leslie Stephen in 1891.

Although 'somewhat sentimentalized by Stephen and his contemporaries', Minny clearly possessed an observational wit and sharpness:

Like her father, she had an acute sense of human ridiculousness, which she could pillory in a phrase, and she had a rod of iron in her character.

Her influence on her husband has also been acknowledged, helping to 'inspire a new sense of confidence and assertiveness' in him.
