= Richmond Ritchie =

Sir Richmond Thackeray Willoughby Ritchie KCB ISO (6 August 1854 – 12 October 1912) was a British civil servant. He spent most of his working life at the India Office, reaching the post of Permanent Under-Secretary of State for India.

== Life ==
He was born in Calcutta, British India, the third son of the jurist William Ritchie (1817–1862) and his wife, Augusta Charlotte Trimmer. He was educated at Eton College and Trinity College, Cambridge (matriculated 1874; B.A. 1878).

In 1877 Ritchie entered the India Office through open competition, as a junior clerk. He acted as Private Secretary to a number Under-Secretaries of State, both Parliamentary and Permanent: from 1895 to 1902 he worked for Lord George Hamilton. He then was transferred to the post of Secretary in the Political and Secret Department.

Ritchie was knighted in 1907, and upon the retirement of Sir Arthur Godley in 1910 he became the Permanent Under-Secretary of State, a position he continued to hold until his death.

== Family ==
In 1877 Ritchie married his second cousin, Anne Isabella Thackeray, the eldest daughter of the novelist William Makepeace Thackeray, and a novelist and author in her own right. Their son William Thackeray Denis Ritchie married Margaret Paulina, daughter of Charles Booth.

== See also ==
- Thomas Holderness
