= Francis Warre-Cornish =

British schoolmaster, scholar and writer

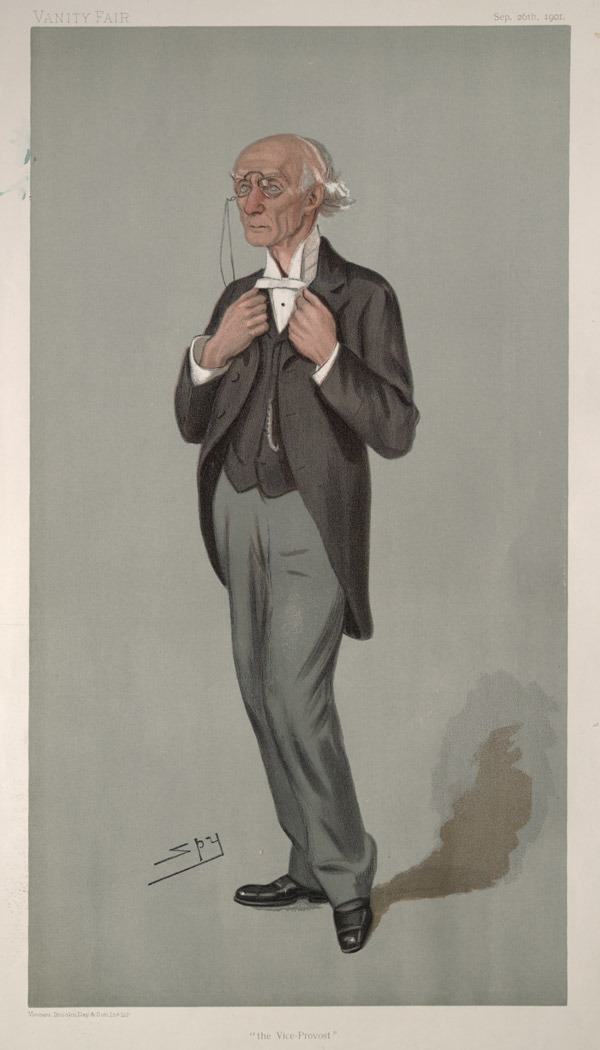
"The Vice-Provost" Warre-Cornish as caricatured by Spy (Leslie Ward) in Vanity Fair, September 1901

Francis Warre Warre-Cornish (8 May 1839 – 28 August 1916) was a British schoolmaster, scholar and writer.

== Life ==
He was the son of Hubert Kestell Cornish, vicar of Bakewell, and his wife Louisa Warre, daughter of Francis Warre (1775–1854), and was educated at Eton College and King's College, Cambridge. He was a master (1861) and subsequently Vice-Provost of Eton, from 1893 to 1916. He resigned from Eton in April 1916 and died in August 1916.

Warre-Cornish married Blanche Ritchie, who was celebrated for her conversational powers and eccentricities. By her, he was the father of the writer Mary (Molly) MacCarthy, known for her involvement in the Bloomsbury Group, and Gerald Warre-Cornish (1874-1916), author of St Paul from the Trenches.

== Selected works ==
- Extracts from the Letters and Journals of William Cory [i.e. William Johnson Cory], author of 'Ionica'. Selected and arranged by Francis Warre Cornish, 1897
- A Concise Dictionary of Greek and Roman Antiquities, 1898, based on William Smith's Dictionary
- (Translator) The Poems of Gaius Valerius Catullus, 1904
- Chivalry, 1908
- A History of the English Church in the Nineteenth Century, 2 volumes, 1910
- Darwell Stories, 1910
- Jane Austen, English Men of Letters, second series, 1913
- Life of Oliver Cromwell, 1882
- Sunningwell [A novel], 1899
