= Neorealism (art) =

Art movement

In art, neorealism refers to a few movements.

== In literature ==
Portuguese neorealism was a Marxist literary movement that began slightly before Salazar’s regime.It was mostly in line with socialist realism.

In Italy, neorealism was a movement that emerged in the end of 1920s and started rapidly developing after World War II. It was represented by such authors as Alberto Moravia, Ignazio Silone, Elio Vittorini, Carlo Levi, Vasco Pratolini and others.

== In painting ==
In Britain, neo-realism in painting was established by the ex-Camden Town Group painters Charles Ginner and Harold Gilman at the beginning of World War I. They set out to explore the spirit of their age through the shapes and colours of daily life. Their intentions were proclaimed in Ginner's manifesto in New Age (1 January 1914), which was also used as the preface to Gilman and Ginner's two-man exhibition of that year. It attacked the academic and warned against the ‘decorative’ aspect of imitators of Post-Impressionism. The best examples of neorealist work is that produced by these two artists; Howard Kanovitz and also Robert Bevan. For Robert Bevan he joined Cumberland Market Group in 1914.

=== Artists ===
- Júlio Pomar (Portugal)
- Candido Portinari (Brazil)

== In cinema ==
Neorealism is characterized by a general atmosphere of authenticity. André Bazin, a French film theorist and critic, argued that neorealism portrays: truth, naturalness, authenticity, and is a cinema of duration. The necessary characteristics of neo-realism in film include:

- a definite social context;
- a sense of historical actuality and immediacy;
- political commitment to progressive social change;
- authentic on-location shooting as opposed to the artificial studio;
- a rejection of classical Hollywood acting styles; extensive use of non-professional actors as much as possible;
- a documentary style of cinematography.

=== Films ===
Precursors

- Land Without Bread (1933, Spain)
- 1860 (1934, Italy)
- An Inn in Tokyo (1935, Japan)
- Toni (1935, France)
- Aniki-Bóbó (1942, Portugal)
- People of the Mountains (1942, Hungary)
- Ossessione (1943, Italy)
- Saltimbancos (1951, Portugal)

Italian

- Roma, città aperta (1945)
- Shoeshine (Sciuscià) (1946)
- Paisà (1946)
- Germania anno zero (1948)
- Bicycle Thieves (Ladri di biciclette) (1948)
- La terra trema (1948)
- Bitter Rice (1949)
- Stromboli (1950)
- Miracle in Milan (1951)
- Umberto D. (1952)
- La strada (1954)
- Rocco and His Brothers (1960)
- Il Posto (1961)

Other countries

- Lowly City (1946, India)
- Drunken Angel (1948, Japan)
- Stray Dog (1949, Japan)
- Los Olvidados (1950, Mexico)
- Surcos (1951, Spain)
- Ikiru (1952, Japan)
- Nagarik (1952, India)
- Tokyo Story (1953, Japan)
- Two Acres of Land (1953, India)
- Salt of the Earth (1954, United States)
- Newspaper Boy (1955, India)
- The Apu Trilogy (1955–1959, India)
- Death of a Cyclist (1955, Spain)
- Cairo Station (1958, Egypt)
- The Runaway (1958, India)
- The 400 Blows (1959, France)
- The Beginning and the End (1960, Egypt)
- Los golfos (1960, Spain)
- Nothing But a Man (1964, United States)
- Jeanne Dielman, 23 Quai du Commerce, 1080 Bruxelles (1975, Belgium)
- Killer of Sheep (1978, United States)
- Pixote (1981, Brazil)
- The Stolen Children (1982, Italy)
- Yol (1982, Turkey)
- Salaam Bombay! (1988, India)
- Veronico Cruz (1988, Argentina)
- American Me (1992, United States)
- Closer to Home (film) (1995, United States)
- Children of Heaven (1997, Iran)
- Satya (1998, India)
- The City (La Ciudad) (1998, United States)
- Not One Less (1999, China)
- Rosetta (1999, France)
- The Circle (Dayereh) (2000, Iran)
- Amores perros (2000, Mexico)
- Bolivia (2001, Argentina)
- Lilja 4-Ever (2002, Sweden)
- Cidade de Deus (2002, Brazil)
- Carandiru (2003, Brazil / Argentina)
- Familia rodante (2004, Argentina, et al.)
- Machuca (2004, Chile)
- The Death of Mr. Lazarescu (2005, Romania)
- L'Enfant (2005, Belgium / France)
- Man Push Cart (2005, United States)
- Half Nelson (2006, United States)
- Still Life (2006, China)
- 4 Months, 3 Weeks and 2 Days (2007, Romania)
- Chop Shop (2007, United States)
- Ballast (2008, United States)
- Frozen River (2008, United States)
- Involuntary (2008, Sweden)
- Lorna's Silence (2008, Belgium)
- Wendy and Lucy (2008, United States)
- Fish Tank (2009, Great Britain)
- Goodbye Solo (2009, United States)
- Sin Nombre (2009, United States / Mexico)
- Treeless Mountain (2009, United States / South Korea)
- Winter's Bone (2010, United States)
- 0-41* (2016, India)
- En el séptimo día (2017, United States)

== See also ==
- History of cinema
- Nouveau réalisme, a later French art movement
