= Frank Welsh =

Frank Welsh may refer to:

- Frank Welsh (writer) (1931–2023), writer on imperial British history
- Frank Welsh (politician) (1871–1959), Australian politician
- Frank S. Welsh (born 1950), president of the U.S.-based Welsh Color and Conservation, Inc.
