= Bice =

Mineral pigment

Color coordinates
- Hex triplet: #2072AF
- sRGB^{B} (r, g, b): (32, 114, 175)
- HSV (h, s, v): (206°, 82%, 69%)
- CIELCh_{uv} (L, C, h): (46, 64, 245°)
- B: Normalized to [0–255] (byte)

Bice, from the French bis, originally meaning dark-coloured, is a green or blue pigment. In French the terms vert bis and azur bis mean dark green and dark blue respectively. Bice pigments were generally prepared from basic copper carbonates, but sometimes ultramarine or other pigments were used.

== Historic usage ==
In 1522 a stone cross with gilt lead stars was erected at the Bullstake in Canterbury, and painted with bice and gilded by Florence the painter. The bice cost 6 shillings the pound.

Jo Kirby of the National Gallery London notes the occurrence of the pigment bice in three grades in an account of Tudor painting at Greenwich Palace in 1527. In this case, the three grades indicate the use of the mineral azurite rather than a manufactured blue copper carbonate. Painters working for the revels at court in 1543 used "bysse" priced at a shilling for a pound. John "Paynter", who worked for Bess of Hardwick, used blue bice in 1596.

Green bice in other 16th-records may sometimes have been the mineral malachite. Later a less expensive source of green bice was a mixture of blue cobalt glass and yellow orpiment.

Ian Bristow, a historian of paint, concluded that the pigment "blue bice" found in records of British interior decoration until the first half of the 17th century was azurite. The expensive natural mineral azurite was superseded by manufactured "blue verditer" or smalt.

The color is also referenced in Edith Nesbit's novel The Story of the Treasure Seekers: "...Alice looked up from her painting. She was trying to paint a fairy queen's frock with green bice, and it wouldn't rub. There is something funny about green bice. It never will rub off; no matter how expensive your paintbox is-and even boiling water is very little use. She said, 'Bother the bice!'..."
