= Historic paint analysis =

Scientific analysis of architectural finishes

Historic paint analysis, or architectural paint research, is the scientific analysis of a broad range of architectural finishes, and is primarily used to determine the color and behavior of surface finishes at any given point in time. This helps us to understand the building's structural history and how its appearance has changed over time. Researchers may gather data for the history of the interior decoration of a building or room.

Historic paint analysis shares a common methodology with the conservation and restoration of paintings used to conserve and restore two- and three dimensional works of art. This involves the identification of components such as organic or inorganic pigments and dyes contained in the pigments. Historic paint analysis also identifies the pigments' media of suspension such as (water, oil, or latex and the paints' associated substrate. A variety of techniques are used to identify and analyze the pigment layers and finish exposure, including Finish Exposure, optical microscopy, fluorescent light microscopy, polarized light microscopy, and Fourier-transform infrared spectroscopy.

These methods are useful for dating purposes as well. Likewise, analyses are used to evaluate levels of risk arising from agents of deterioration that can affect paint loss, surface deterioration, interaction with newer materials, substrates, de-lamination, media and pigment deterioration, and alligatoring. With this information the conservation scientist or researcher of historic interiors can develop a better understanding of the chronology of the painted surface and make recommendations useful in restoring its appearance to a previous state while ensuring its longevity.

== History ==
Historic architectural paint analysis finds its roots in the early twentieth century in the United States. The historic preservation movement began in 1849 with the preservation of Mount Vernon, the home of George Washington. Early preservationists became interested in authenticity. They began to realize that paints and finishes which had survived were very important but may not have been the original, or most significant, finishes.

In the 1950s and 1960s, paint colours were investigated at Independence National Historical Park in Philadelphia by the architect Penelope Hartshorne Batcheler. Her pioneering efforts introduced the use of a stereo microscope to examine the 18th century paints used at Independence Hall. Batcheler also introduced the use of the Munsell color system for matching and referencing colours. Her landmark publication, Paint Color Research and Restoration, was the first publication concerning the analysis of historic architectural paints for determination of original colour. At the same time, in the United Kingdom, microscopy of paint samples was developed by Joyce Plesters of the National Gallery, London who worked mainly with easel paintings but also with samples from wall-paintings.

In the 1960s and early 1970s, Morgan W. Phillips at the Society for the Preservation of New England Antiquities (SPNEA) became involved with historic paint and color analysis, at the Harrison Gray Otis House in Boston. At the same time, E. Blaine Cliver, historical architect, who had worked with Batcheler at the National Park Service in Philadelphia, with the National Trust for Historic Preservation in Washington, DC, and later at the Northeast Regional Office of the Park Service, became involved with historic paint analysis. He set up a laboratory in Building 28 of the former Boston Navy Yard.

Frank S. Welsh, who studied historic paints with Batcheler, introduced the use of the National Bureau of Standards Color Name Charts, (National Institute of Standards and Technology) for naming colours matched to the Munsell color system. Welsh introduced the term "paint analysis" into the lexicon of historic preservation.

== Sampling methods ==
Historically, paint analysis was done on-site by carefully removing later paint layers to reveal a sequence of finishes down to the substrate, this method is commonly referred to as the scratch and match method. This was the methodology employed during the early restoration of finishes at Historic Williamsburg. Although this method is employed by a few practitioners, it is not common because of its inherent problems of misinterpretation and failure to address issues such as paint aging and discoloration.

Because finished analysis is performed under laboratory conditions, samples are collected in the field for later analysis and can be collected by the analyst or by ship to a client. The samples are labeled during the collection process. Typical information includes the sample number, building name, building location, name of the collector, date of collection, and specific data regarding the actual location of the sample.

According to David Arbogast's recommendations for sample collection, samples are typically collected in one of two types of packages. Manila coin envelopes are highly recommended. They have large flaps which should remain unsealed. There is virtually no possibility of the sample migrating from such an envelope. The other possibility is plastic resealable (Ziploc) bags which can be opened and reclosed at will. The only drawback to this type of package is that labeling can be difficult. The samples are collected using a sharp metal blade such as a scalpel". The sample need not be large at all as it is viewed through a microscope but should have all its paint layers well adhered to each other and to their respective substrates.

When removing a paint sample, it is important to also remove a piece of the substrate to ensure the stratigraphy collected is complete. To identify different pigments, binders, and colors within historic architectural sites, "Experts use a combination of mechanical and chemical investigations to reveal the hidden layers, while a microscopy lab analysis of the layers and substrate is used to define original colors and finishes."

The traditional method of carrying out a "scrape" using a scalpel is a slow and very inaccurate method of exposing the earlier layers. The disadvantages of the former technique are that given the relatively low level of magnification it is easy to miss critical layers and to misidentify layers such as primed coats as being historic finish coats. Also, the variable light sources on site alter the perception of the colors to varying degrees. It is often more effective to make a small crater with a knife and then to sand the edges to a gradual slope, the paint layers widening as the surface is rubbed down. The finished result will look like a bulls-eye, or target, with the full sequence of coats revealed. In past and recent analysis, paint researchers have become increasingly aware that the samples removed from the site for study may not represent the true historic color. Due to this inaccuracy in traditional sampling methods, architectural paint research had developed into material science.

== Agents of deterioration ==
Historic paint analysts rely on the chemical properties of pigments to correctly identify and date pigments within historical paint analysis. However, successful analysis of pigments may depend on physical, chemical, and biological deterioration. The top layer of substrate is more susceptible to biological and physical weather damage while lower layers are susceptible to chemical damage based on the microbial deterioration. In order for conservators to create a plan to identify and protect historic paint, they must understand how the agents of deterioration act.

=== Light ===
Light deterioration causes oxidization and other degradation of the inorganic and organic pigment and media components of paints, as visible light can fade, bleach, or darken the surface and outer layers of paints. For external murals and buildings, air pollution can cause disintegration, discoloration, or corrode the paint murals and facades.

=== Chemical interaction ===
Paints made with pigments dispersed in the medium of linseed oil can yellowing over an extended period of time. To prepare samples for analysis this yellowing can be bleaching samples for two weeks under a fluorescent tube. The colour of the sample can then measured with a chromameter. As well as an understanding of how colour and pigments age, the conservator or paint analyst will use their knowledge of historic architecture, building history, interior decoration, craft practices, architectural finishes and their materials and manufacture.

=== Biodegradation ===
Many elements in the natural environment can lead to the degradation of paint. Microorganisms, fungi and algae can degrade the pigments, binders and medium of suspension and substrate through their respiratory activities. Orio Ceferri cites these several factors: "...cyanobacteria and algae growing on paintings exposed to light, such as frescoes on the facades of buildings, may cause considerable damage. Besides the aesthetic damage caused by a green, black, brown, or yellow algal patina covering the painted portions, these organisms may cause weathering of the surface layers, accelerating detachment of portions of the painted layer as well as the underlying plaster".

=== Incorrect temperature ===
Unsuitable temperatures can cause paint layers to crack and fractures can be seen in samples using an optical microscope. At low temperatures, "materials such as varnishes, lacquers, wood, oil, alkyd, and acrylic paints are especially at risk and need to be handled with extreme care". Similarly, incorrect relative humidity can break paint if the air is too dry, while high humidity can result in deformities, swelling, and mold can affect organic pigment samples. Consistent temperature and humidity fluctuations can affect the water content of the paint. These deformities may start as a small area of the paint layer but can quickly "increase in the surface area if left undetected".

=== Physical force ===
Physical force can cause chips, cracks, and breaks in pigment layers from improper work handling. All staff and handlers should be trained on proper moving procedures when transporting artwork to prevent this mishandling.

=== Fire ===
Fire will result in complete, irreversible damage to the pigment on any work of art or historic building. To prevent damage, organizations should have an Emergency Plan to determine the best course of action in case of a fire while also having the correct safety measure to prevent collections or building fires.

=== Vandalism ===
Vandalism, such as graffiti, to historical façade creates a layer of inorganic paint to historical pigments.

=== Water ===
Water is the biggest concern in the deterioration of paint and pigments. Water can cause mold and increase humidity in buildings and paintings alike. Mold and moisture increase introduces pests and increases deterioration.

Housekeeping is essential for preventative care: for example, with more attention to climate and pollution, these studies can help decrease the pigment deterioration of historical buildings and sites. For interior spaces, mechanical control of internal temperature, light, and humidity through an HVAC system and good conservation care will help decrease the amount of decay.

These agents of deterioration hinder measuring the colour of a historic paint, either by the use of a chromameter, or the Munsell color system, which directly matches paint shades. The Munsell color system is a scientific system in which colors have been ranged into a color fan based upon three attributes: hue or color, the chroma or color saturation, and the value or neutral lightness or darkness.

== Analysis ==
Paint analysis involves at least three processes, and will take place only after an examination of the documentary and archival information available on the interior and building.

The sequence will be rough as follows:

1. The taking of paint samples and the making of cross-sections...these will then be drawn or photographed;
2. With the stratigraphy of the cross-section made clear by a drawing or photomicrograph, a scrape will then be made. The scrape must then be exposed to UV light for a period of time in order to clean up the color.
3. Pigment and media identification will be carried out
4. The evaluation of the cleaned-up color may be made by comparison with trial batches made up using the identified pigments.

The purposes of analysis are to determine historic finishes and their principal components of media and pigments. There are two methods in the preparation of paint samples for microscopic analysis. The first is to mount the sample in a permanent medium such as paraffin or resin. The specimen is then ground to a flat finish, providing a horizontal surface for viewing layers in cross-section under a microscope. Samples are ground by mechanical methods to best reveal the paint layers. The second is to leave the samples in a loose condition with their broken surfaces which then can be manipulated under the microscope to permit a variety of views of the layers.

Sequences of paint layers resulting from decades of decoration reveal color schemes in chronological order. Samples from different features of a room or building can be compared to tabulate changes in decoration on different features within successive schemes of interior decoration, revealing changes in fashion and taste. Samples from newer elements of a building will have fewer paint layers. Paint analysts are usually well-qualified to report on historic phases of decoration, architectural changes, and historical paint materials and craft practice and input into the presentation and interpretation of heritage buildings.

=== Methods of analysis ===
Finish exposure

Finish exposures are performed on-site by carefully removing more recent paint layers in order to reveal historic colours and patterns. This can be done mechanically and/or with chemical strippers. Finish exposure is useful to uncover hidden murals or stencil patterns, and may reveal much of the story of a historic decorative scheme.

Optical microscopy

Optical microscopy is capable of resolving the coarse to fine (50-2mμ-m) particles found in historic paint, thus they can be identified unambiguously in most cases. This size range affects surface appearance.

Polarized light microscopy (PLM)

Polarized light microscopy illuminates pigment particles from a sample using polarized light. The technique provides reliable and compound-specific particle identification, it is high-resolution in the sense that a single particle among hundreds of different ones may be identified accurately, and it is also selective.

Pigment identification with polarized light microscopy (PLM)

To collect a pigment sample for polarized light microscopy(PLM), "a surgical scalpel is used to collect a small scraping from a clean, representative area of paint in an unmounted sample. The tip of the blade is then pressed and pulled across a clean glass microscope slide, dispersing the pigment particles across the surface. The pigment is embedded under a coverslip using Cargill Meltmounts. The embedded pigments are then examined in cross and plane-polarized transmitted light under the microscope. Digital images are captured to study the size, shape, and other morphologies of the paint sample."

Fourier transform infrared spectrometry

Fourier transform infrared spectrometry is a type of infrared spectrometry used to identify inorganic and organic components of compounds. It can determine the type of paint medium and some pigments. FITR is useful for historic paint analysis because it is "best used for the analysis of materials to aid in the choice of the optimum solvent needed to selectively remove certain coatings while leaving others unaffected."

Portable spectrophotometer

There are several factors that complicate the task of obtaining an accurate colour reading on a sample of paint. One of the most common arise from the variance in lighting conditions under which the sample is viewed, causing the color perceived to "shift". This is perceptual shift can produce inaccuracies in "reading" the paint sample under different lighting conditions, and cause what is referred to as a "metameric match". Paint analysts can use a spectrophotometer to obtain a more objective match. and modern instruments can take accurate readings in situ. This is particularly useful in those instances in which paint samples cannot be readily transported to a laboratory, such as occurs when the substrate cannot be extracted nor transported, such as a metal gutter spout. Patrick Baty contends that "computer software with the spectrophotometer allows colour matches to be made for all light conditions (daylight, domestic lighting and office lighting being the most commonly specified) and metamerism can be avoided, or predicted, if inevitable".

Using the Munsell Color System, the hue notation, the color, indicates the relation of the sample to a visually equally spaced scale of 100 hues. There are 10 major hues, five principal and five intermediate within this scale. The hues are identified by initials indicating the central member of the group: red R, yellow-red YR, yellow Y, yellow-green YG, green G, blue-green BG, blue B, purple-blue PB, purple P, and red-purple PR. The hues in each group are identified by the numbers 1 to 10. The most purplish of the red hues, 1 on the scale of 100, is designated as 1R, the most yellowish as 10R, and the central hue as 5R. The hue 10R can also be expressed as 10, 5Y as 25, and so forth if a notation of the hue as a number is desired. Chroma indicates the degree of departure of a given hue from the neutral gray axis of the same value. It is the strength of saturation of color from neutral gray, written /0 to /14 or further for maximum color saturation.

Value, or lightness, makes up the neutral gray axis of the color wheel, ranging from black, number 1, to white at the top of the axis, number 10. A visual value can be approximated by the help of the neutral gray chips of the Rock or Soil Color chart with ten intervals. The color parameters can be expressed with figures semi-quantitatively as: hue, value/chroma (H, V/C). The color "medium red" should serve as an example for presentation with the three color attributes, 5R 5.5/6. This means that 5R is located in the middle of the red hue, 5.5 is the lightness of Munsell value near the middle between light and dark, and 6 is the degree of the Munsell chroma, or the color saturation, which is about in the middle of the saturation scale.

== Interpretation ==
The most common application of historic paint analysis is to reconstruct the physical appearance of a structure or interior at some point in its history, and or, to understand the evolution and changes to a building's structure.

=== Preservation "as found" ===
When the goal of treatment is preservation, a building's existing historic features and finishes are maintained and repaired, saving as much of the historic paint when possible. At times, all that is needed is a simple cleaning of surfaces or the addition of a protective coating to preserve and protect the finish's integrity. If repainting is all that is required, the new paint is matched to existing paint colors using safer, modern and more durable formulations. In these cases, restoring the appearance of an earlier surface is not the objective.

=== Rehabilitation ===
In a typical rehabilitation, more latitude exists in choosing both the type and colour of paint as the objective is the efficient reuse of interior spaces. Selection often weighs factors such as economy and durability, use of a high-quality standard paint from a local or national company and application by a qualified contractor. Colour choices may be based on paint research reports prepared for interior rooms or exteriors of comparable date and style. More often, though, current color values and taste are taken into account.

Both interiors and exteriors of institutional buildings, such as university buildings, city halls, libraries, and churches often contain rich decorative detailing. During rehabilitation, care should be taken to retain or restore selected portions of the decorative work as well as the color matching process, to evoke the historic sense of time and place. At minimum, it is essential to use historically correct paint colors in placement.

=== Restoration and reinstatement ===
In a restoration project, the goal is to depict the property as it appeared during its period of greatest significance. Based on historical paint research surface colours and treatments can be recreated to reflect the property at a particular period of time. In the restoration process, colours are custom-matched by professionals to give an accurate representation using the methods described above to sustain the historic integrity of the building. If an artist or artisan can be found, the historically replicated paint may be applied using techniques appropriate to the period of the restoration. Although custom paint manufacture is seldom undertaken, colour and glazing are equally capable of being customized.

One of the earliest examples of structural restoration based upon historic paint analysis is the restoration of Williamsburg, Virginia, funded by John D. Rockefeller in the 1920s. Investigations carried out by Susan Nashof by simple scraping and revealing of older finishes of buildings yielded a palette that became popularly known as Williamsburg colors. However, advances in paint colour research suggested that the popular Williamsburg color palette was derived from faded and aged finishes. During the 1980s and 1990s, Colonial Williamsburg consulted with Welsh to undertake a comprehensive paint and color analysis on numerous buildings in the historic area. The study, "the first modern scientific paint analysis" at Williamsburg, confirmed that the color palette did not represent historic color as first intended. In addition he found that some of the colors chosen were from later paint layers, some nineteenth-century. "Interestingly, many of the colors were still based on Susan Nash‘s early research. Four years ago, Benjamin Moore released the 'Williamsburg Color Collection.' Comprising 144 colors, this updated palette is the product of close collaboration with CWF experts using modern Architectural Paint Research methods including microscopy, instrumental analysis, and colorimetry complemented by archival research to provide a range, which is believed to accurately reflect 18th century Williamsburg‘s architectural finishes”. Based on this type of research, Colonial Williamsburg has undergone a paint restoration process to restore building colors and paint to their original intended appearance.

=== Architectural anthropology ===
Historic paint analysis can be utilized to further develop an understanding for how people may have lived or worked at a given time. One example of such an analysis can be seen in a study of the frescoes from Pompeii. An investigation at the temple of Venus at Pompeii characterized a new yellow/brown pigment specific to the region. The pigment analysis concluded that the color was composed of materials with a close chemical composition to the products of somma-vesuvius. This led researchers to suggest that there was a local production of this pigment in the region. Investigations such as this can allow researchers to understand how people may have lived or worked at a given point in history.

=== Architectural dating ===
Architectural dating from historic paint analysis can come from many different processes. The date, or period of a building can be sourced from the materials identified within the layers of pigment or finish, from a specific stylistic feature or technique, or historical records and evidence. Architectural dating can be used to identify a building's construction or structural changes. In some instances, changes in paint composition can be used for dating purposes, such as occurs in the instance of lead-based paints .

Until 1977, lead was commonly used in paints to stabilize the pigment. In an investigation from the Osborn House, Isle of Wight, researchers were able to identify different levels of lead in three different layers of paint. This can help to identify the dates of major structural changes. If one room has lead paint where another does not, this would indicate the room without lead paint was a more recent addition.

=== Wallpaper analysis ===
Interest in historic wallpapers developed with the interest in historic paint and colour. Investigation into a structure's original appearance can sometimes involve wallpaper, depending on styles and trends that a historic site has evolved through. Paint and wallpaper analysis is closely related when trying to answer the question of a building's original appearance or aesthetic. The main purpose of wallpaper analysis is to identify what wallpaper may have existed within a structure, which provides detail on the site's interior decor scheme during a point in history. Wallpaper and paint analysis become more intertwined when looking at historic paint sample layers, which could also include wallpaper and wallpaper glue. This type of sample can provide detail on whether or not wallpaper was used throughout a structure's history. The style and design of wallpaper found during the wallpaper analysis can be identified by wallpaper historians. The importance of the wallpaper analysis can provide detail about what the appearance may have looked like.

== Implications ==
As the tools, techniques, and methodologies of historic paint samples evolve, so do the complexities involved in interpretation as nuance adds to an already complicated narrative. Interpretation requires that conservation scientists work in concert with architectural historians to decipher the stratigraphic record, not only to consider the taste and preferences that informed paint selections, but the social, political, and economic climate of their manufacture and consumption as well.

For example, conservator and material analyst Kristen Moffitt (Colonial Williamsburg Foundation, Conservation, Conservator & Materials Analyst) tells how Patrick Baty used soot laminated between layers of a sample to determine the point at which the pre- and post-industrial eras diverged, as regulations were introduced into London, England. Likewise, she notes that the color of paint samples can also serve as socio-economic indicators and tell us a lot about the lived-experience of those who inhabited the structure. Mat Webster, executive director for Granger Department of Architectural Preservation and Research at Colonial Williamsburg joins Moffit in noting that samples collected of a deeper, more intense hue are derived from costly pigments imported from England (and initially globally sourced). Therefore, they are used sparingly and appear in only the most public rooms of the house. These data not only inform Material Culture Studies that help the architectural historian and archaeologist model historic economic-trade networks, but help us hypothesize about historic social hierarchies at work as well. These data are critical to our understanding of the conditions under which occupants lived, adding richness and texture to the historical record.

Moffit also explains how discontinuities can reveal misconceptions about historic aesthetic schemas when scientific information is absent. Referencing a sample taken from an 18th-century colonial home in Williamsburg, Virginia, Moffit explains that the underlying layers on both hinge and door were initially painted in the same color, in keeping with the aesthetic of their time. However, analysis of a subsequent layer exposed an incongruous black and white schema, indicating a failed attempt at a colonial revival aesthetic. Without proper understanding of the historic record, these samples might lead to false conclusions if obtained through inferior “scratch and match” methods and visual inspection alone. As mentioned in the section discussing sampling techniques, methods of collection have improved considerably over the past few decades, and more reliable scientific protocols have replaced the older “scratch and match” method that Baty considers “pseudo analysis” as results are unreliable and deceiving.

=== Color shift ===
Many factors can cause pigments to fade or "shift" over time, under the influence of the agents of deterioration detailed in the introductory sections above, leading to erroneous conclusions when colors have faded or been otherwise compromised over time. For instance, what may appear to the eye to read as an "olive green" through visual inspection alone but may actually be identified as Prussian blue in the laboratory. Likewise, the accumulation of particulate matter from smoke or fire may accumulate on painted walls or ceilings, and if left untreated, over time, may cast a yellow hue that is mistakenly accepted as part of the intended color scheme.

Color shift can pose a problem to the conservator tasked with restoring a structure to its authentic appearance when the altered condition is understood as the intended schema- especially when based on older “scratch and match” assessments described above. Uncorrected, this can lead to a pervasive misreading of the historic record, such as occurs when we mistakenly perceive a historic schema to be muted, or intentionally ‘restrained’ when in actuality, it has only oxidized. Moffit reports that many visitors to historic Williamsburg are surprised to encounter the bright and vibrant hues that we now understand to be historically correct.

=== Authenticity and historic color palettes ===
While some might suggest that flawed restorations are equally worthy of presentation, Baty contends that "stagnation, and the rejection of new research" would only ensue. Baty is a fervent advocate for historical authenticity in the reconstruction of historic interiors, arguing that "it is the study of their development that contributes to our understanding of our culture and its influences. He cautions against those who would dismiss new information that contradicts our historical sensibilities, specifically when it demands costly revisions to historic decorative schemas.

Still, others like Architectural Conservator Tania Alam argue for a more flexible interpretation of the past when authenticity runs counter to the cause of structural preservation. In an article from the proceedings from Are We There Yet?, Alam references at least two instances where varying degrees of fantasy are credited for structural preservation.

Alam cites the work of architect and designer Alexander Girard in his 1961 successful bid for the revitalization plan of Washington Street in downtown Columbus, Indiana. Alam notes that Girard did not rely on scientific methods but simply " visualized the restoration primarily through the use of a color scheme, which would highlight the architectural features of the Victorian commercial buildings to work in tandem with the newly designed signage." Girard was ultimately successful at revitalizing historical structures slated for demolition in the district at a low cost.

She follows with the work of Leonard Horowitz, whose 1980s whimsical pastel palette for the revitalization project of South Beach Miami is credited not only with preserving a declining area but putting the area on the cultural map. Horowitz's whimsical palette accentuated the architectural features of the buildings in question, restoring them to life and establishing the now revered Art Deco District of South Beach Miami.

Alam acknowledges that neither Girard nor Horowitz relied upon scientific evidence in the construct of their revitalization proposals. However, she contends that these transgressions may be forgiven when the preservation structures rest in the balance and concludes that, "In their attempts to restore and save the historic fabric, both these color palettes essentially created new aesthetics in the respective area. Girad and Horowitz worked in the context of the lived environment and relied upon invented schemas intended to revitalize urban districts, while Baty's work centers upon historic preservation, an arena where scholarship and public education are paramount. As the practice of historic paint analysis continues to evolve, the poles between fact and fiction will likely come to an acceptable equilibrium. But until then, an educated public must be able to make this distinction.

== Sources ==
- Batcheler, Penelope Hartshorne. "Paint Color Research and Restoration", Technical Leaflet #15, American Association for State and Local History, History News, Vol. 23, No. 10, (October 1968)
- Baty, Patrick. The Rôle of Paint Analysis in the Historic Interior. The Journal of Architectural Conservation. (March 1995): 27–37.
- Baty, Patrick. To Scrape or Not To Scrape?. Traditional Paint News, Vol 1 No 2 (October 1996): 9–15.
- Baty, Patrick. "The Benefit of Hindsight". Some Tips on Commissioning Paint Analysis An article based on a paper given at the English Heritage Layers of Understanding conference that took place in London on 28 April 2000.
- Bristow, Ian C., Architectural Colour in British Interiors, 1615–1840, Yale (1996)
- Bristow, Ian C., Interior House Painting Colours and Technology, 1615–1840, Yale (1996)
- Gettens, Rutherford J., and Stout, George L. Painting Materials: A Short Encyclopedia. New York: Dover Publications, (1966)
- Hughes, Helen, ed., Layers of Understanding: Seminar Proceeding 28 April 2000, Donhead (2002)
- Maycock, Susa and Zimmerman, Sarah Painting Historic Exteriors: Colors, Application and Regulation: A Resource Guide, Cambridge Historical Commission, Cambridge, Massachusetts, (1998/2006)
- Moss, Roger W. Paint in America: The Colors of Historic Buildings The Preservation Press, Washington, D.C., (1994)
- Moss, Roger W. Century of Color: Exterior Decoration for American Buildings, 1829–1920, American Life Foundation, Watkins Glen, New York, (1981)
- Phillips, Morgan W. "Problems in the Restoration and Preservation of Old House Paints, Preservation and Conservation", In Principles and Practices. Proceedings of the North American International Regional Conference, Williamsburg, Virginia, and Philadelphia, Pennsylvania, September 10–16. 1972. The Preservation Press, National Trust for Historic Preservation in the United States, (1976)
- Sherwin-Williams. Heritage Colors: Authentic Exterior Colors of American Buildings, 1820–1920 American Life Foundation, Watkins Glen, New York, (1981)
