= Cumberland Market Group =

British artistic group

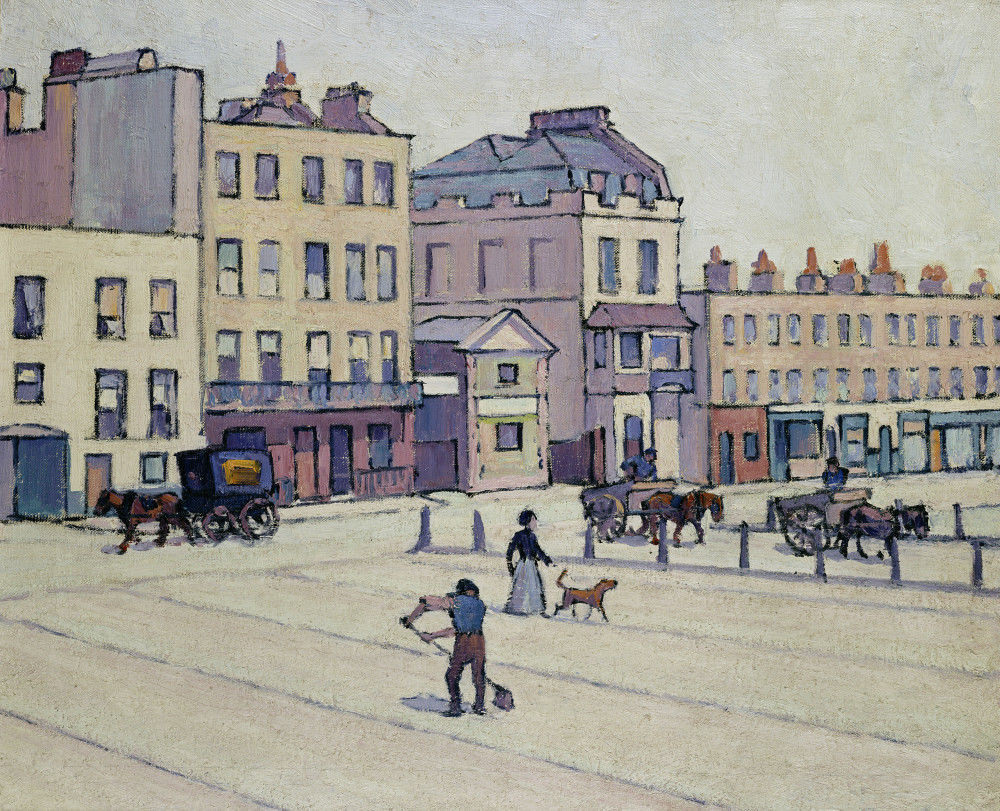
Robert Bevan. The Weigh House, Cumberland Market, c. 1914.

The Cumberland Market Group was a short-lived artistic grouping in early twentieth century London. The group met in the studio of Robert Bevan in Cumberland Market, the old hay and straw market off Albany Street, and held one exhibition.

== History ==
Robert Bevan took the rooms on the first floor of 49 Cumberland Market, north of Regent's Park, in April 1914, after the break-up of the Camden Town Group and the formation of its successor, the London Group. He had been a founder member of both organizations. He held meetings there with his friends, and these became a formalised group towards the end of the year, founded by him with fellow Camden Town Group members, Charles Ginner and Harold Gilman, who began to work with the style called Neo-Realism.

They defined what they did as exploring the shapes and colours of daily life (in particular those of north-west London), while also paying attention to their proper disposition compositionally and maintaining sensitivity to the medium of paint itself as key to an expressive image; the strong emphasis on natural observation was a differentiation from the Camden Town Group. These principles were announced in a manifesto by Ginner published in New Age on 1 January 1914, and also employed as the preface to a joint show that year by Gilman and Ginner. It spoke against the "decorative" features of Post-Impressionist followers, as well as attacking academic art.

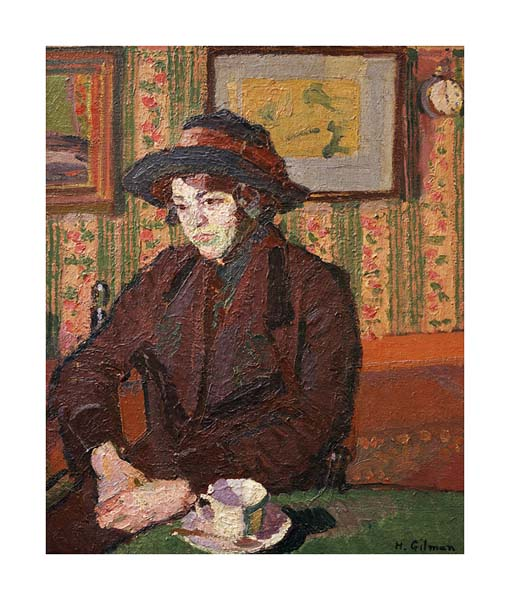
Harold Gilman. Girl with a Tea Cup c. 1914

In 1915 they were joined by John Nash. In April of that year the only exhibition of the Cumberland Market Group was held in the Goupil Gallery. The group was subsequently enlarged by the addition of the American artist Edward McKnight Kauffer and by Christopher Nevinson, but it held no further formal exhibitions. From 1916 to 1917 a School of Painting was run in Soho, based on the group's artistic philosophy. Goupil’s continued to be of help by allowing the group's Saturday afternoon "At Homes" to be moved to their Grey Room. Although not officially dissolved, the group lapsed after Gilman's death in 1919.

In 1921 Bevan organised, with Ginner, an exhibition of Un Groupe de Peintres Anglais Modernes at the Galerie Druet in Paris to present their own work and that of Stanislawa de Karlowska, Gilman, and the next generation artists E.M. O'Rourke Dickey, McKnight Kauffer, John Nash, Edward Wadsworth, William Roberts and Ethelbert White.

== Legacy ==
A Countryman in Town: Robert Bevan and the Cumberland Market Group was held at Southampton City Art Gallery, 26 September – 14 December 2008. It moved to Abbot Hall Art Gallery, Kendal, 13 January – 21 March 2009.

== Bibliography ==
- Robert Bevan, Robert Bevan: A Memoir by his Son. London, Studio Vista. 1965.
- Frances Stenlake, Robert Bevan from Gauguin to Camden Town. London, Unicorn Press. 2008.
- John Yeates, NW1. The Camden Town Artists. A social history. Somerset, Heale Gallery. 2007.
