= Robert Bevan (artist) =

British painter

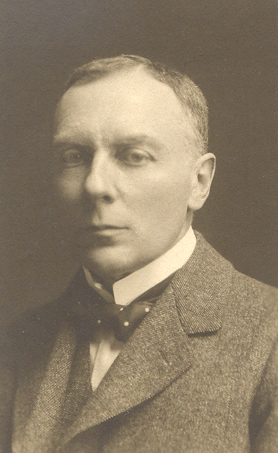
- Robert Bevan c. 1915
- Born: Robert Polhill Bevan; 5 August 1865; Hove, England
- Died: 8 July 1925 (aged 59); London, England
- Education: Arthur Ernest Pearce, Westminster School of Art, Académie Julian
- Known for: Painting
- Notable work: The Cabyard, Night; Dunn's Cottage
- Movement: Camden Town Group, London Group, Cumberland Market Group

Robert Polhill Bevan (5 August 1865 – 8 July 1925) was a British painter, draughtsman and lithographer who was married to the Polish-born artist Stanisława de Karłowska. He was a founding member of the Camden Town Group, the London Group, and the Cumberland Market Group.

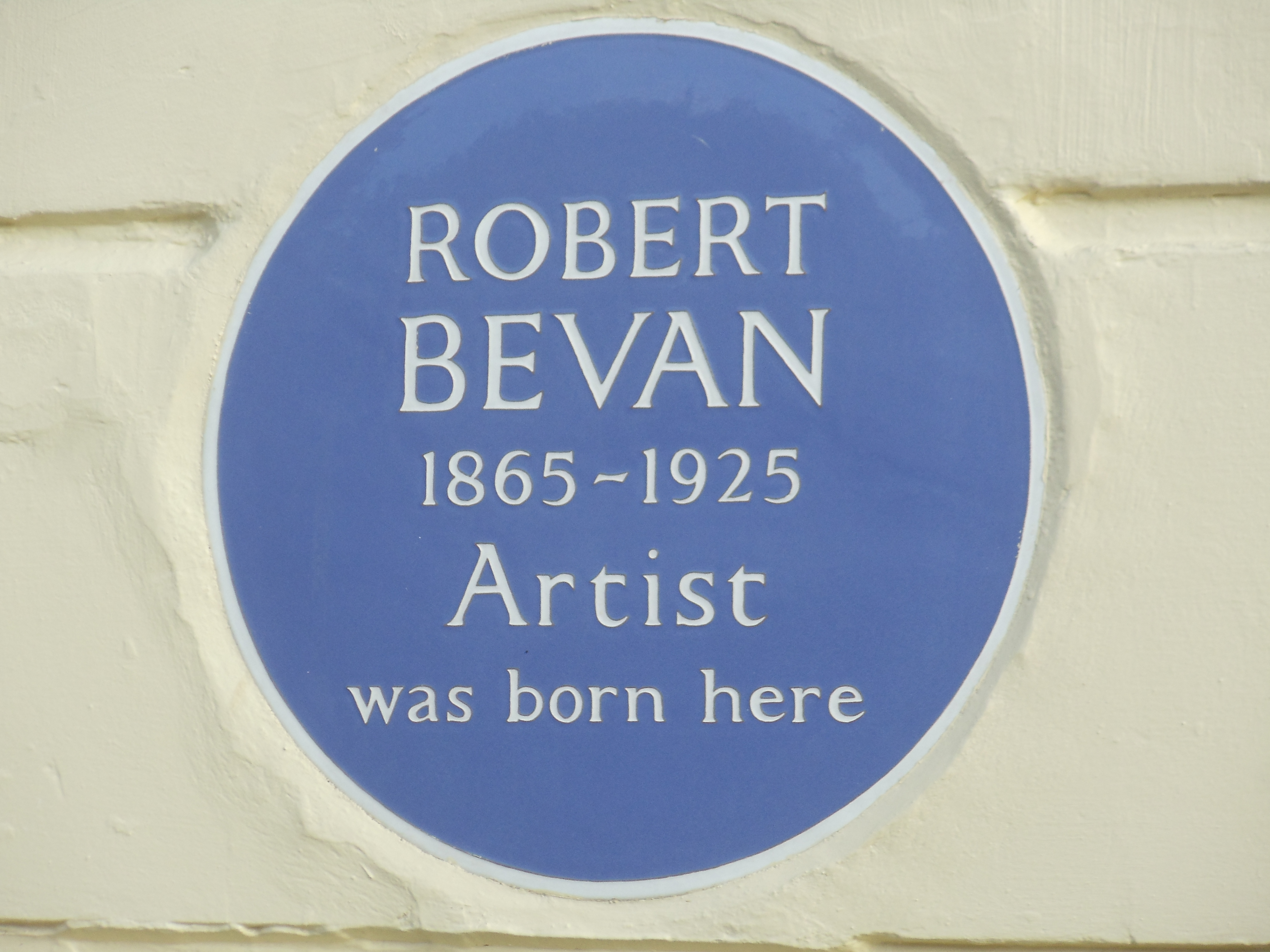
Blue plaque for Robert Bevan in Hove

== Early life ==
He was born in Brunswick Square, Hove, near Brighton, the fourth of six children of Richard Alexander Bevan (1834–1918), a banker, and Laura Maria Polhill. The Bevans had been a Quaker family with long associations with Barclays Bank. They were descended from Silvanus Bevan the Plough Court apothecary and Robert Barclay the Quaker Apologist. The family, who could trace direct descent from Iestyn ap Gwrgant, had left Wales in the 17th century and settled in London.

His first teacher of drawing was Arthur Ernest Pearce, who later became head designer to Royal Doulton potteries. In 1888 he studied art under Fred Brown at the Westminster School of Art before moving to the Académie Julian in Paris. Amongst his fellow students were Paul Sérusier, Pierre Bonnard, Édouard Vuillard and Maurice Denis. Bevan made his first visit to Brittany with a fellow student Eric Forbes-Robertson in 1890 and stayed at the Villa Julia, in Pont-Aven. He made a second visit in the autumn of the following year before travelling to Morocco by way of Madrid to study Velasquez and Goya at first hand. He appears to have done more fox-hunting in Tangier than drawing in the company of the artists Joseph Crawhall and George Denholm Armour and was Master of the Tangier Hunt in his second season.

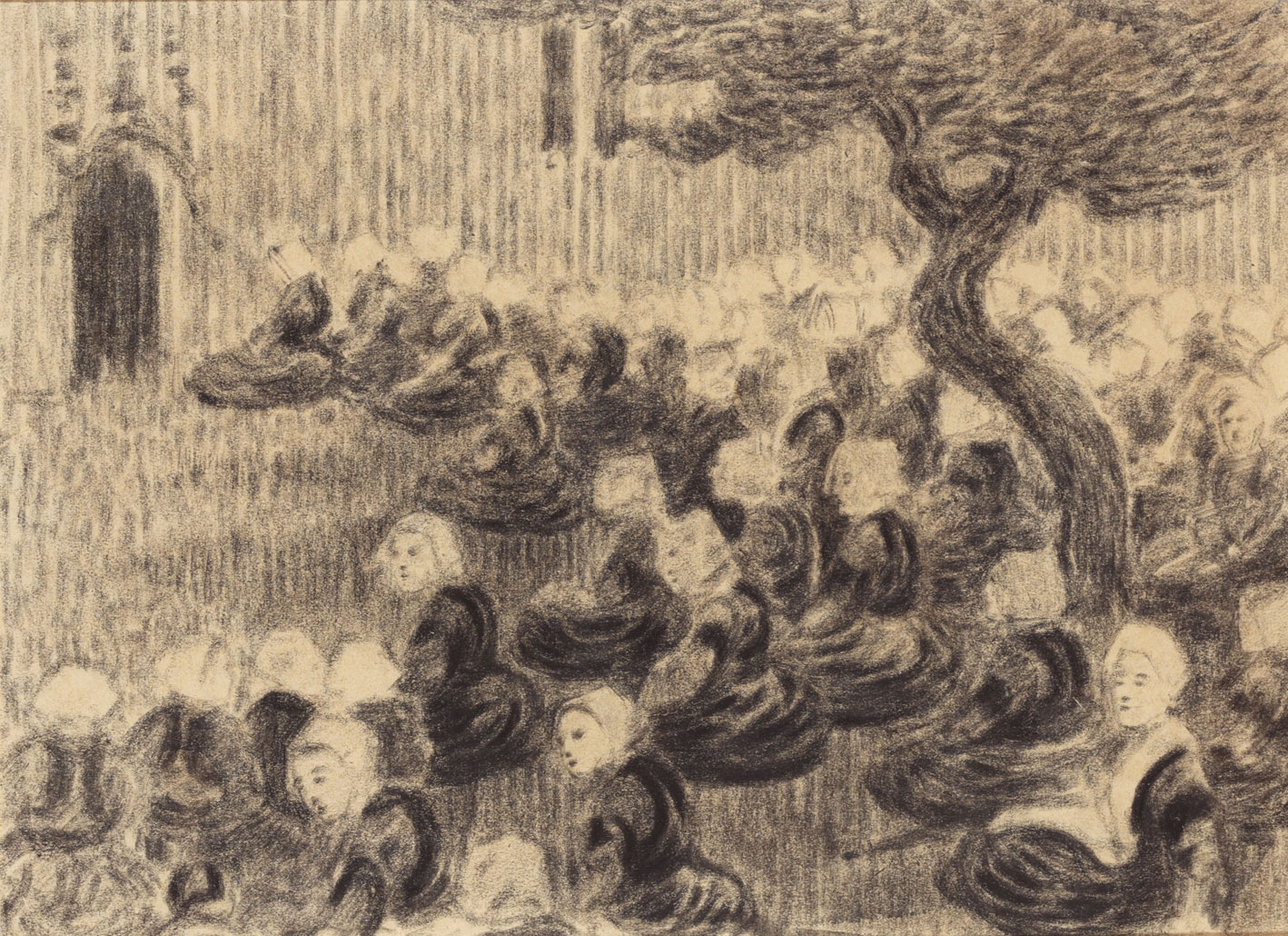
Breton Churchyard, c. 1893

Bevan returned to Brittany in 1893. There is no evidence that he had ever met Van Gogh but it is obvious in the swirling trees and landscape of his Breton drawings that he knew his work. It is known that he was friendly with Paul Gauguin, who gave him several prints. Bevan also received encouragement from Renoir, particularly in his drawing of horses. Although not evident in the few paintings that survive from this period it is in his drawings, early prints, and two surviving wax panels that the obvious influence of Pont-Aven synthetism can be seen.

On his return to England in 1894 Bevan went to live on Exmoor where he was able to combine painting with hunting.

== Married life ==
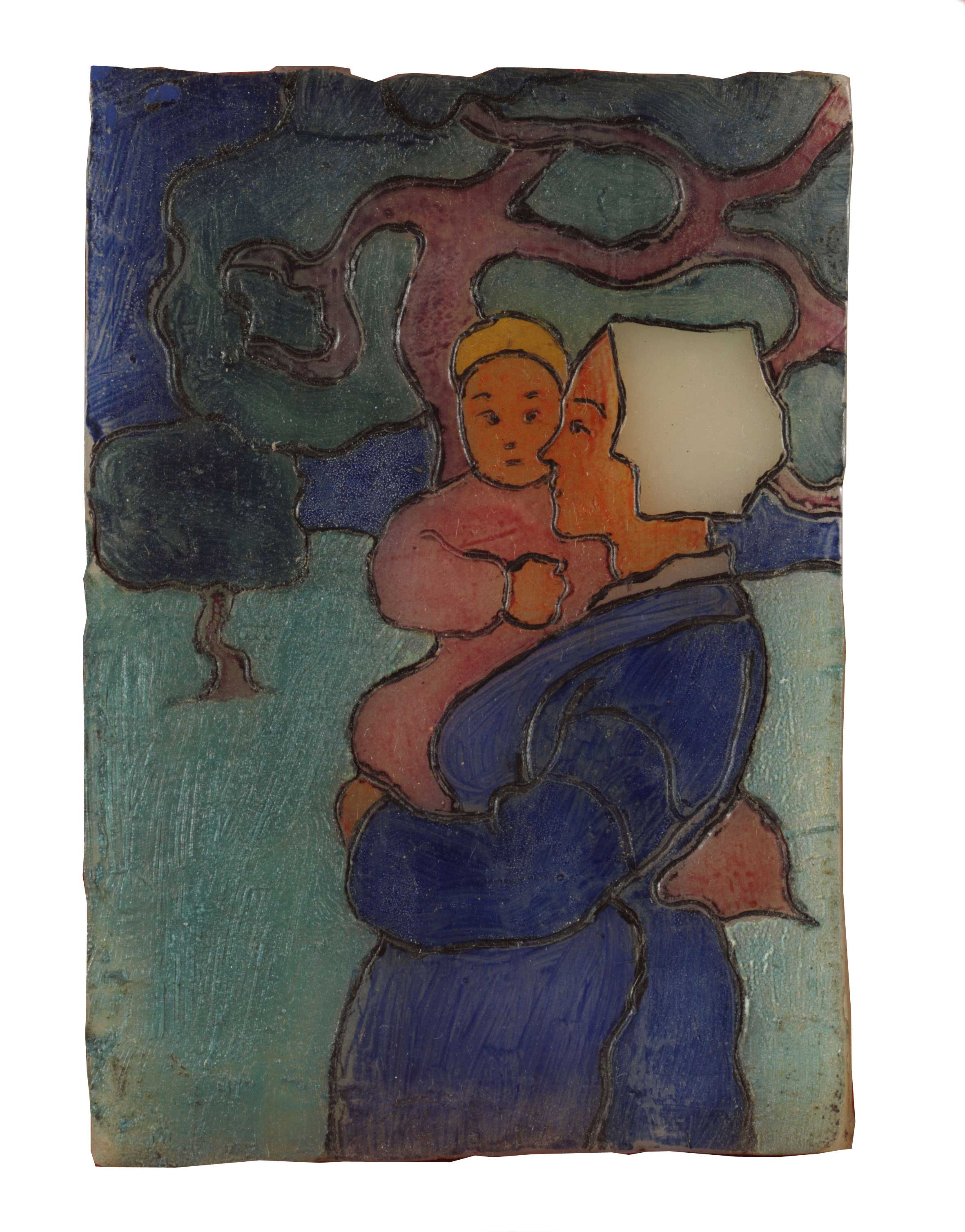
Breton Mother and Child, c. 1894

In the summer of 1897 Bevan met the Polish painter Stanisława de Karłowska at the wedding of Polish art student Janina Flamm with Eric Forbes-Robertson in Jersey. At the end of the year Bevan and de Karłowska married in Warsaw. Her father had extensive land in central Poland and for the remainder of their married life they would make long summer visits there.

In 1900 the Bevans settled in London at 14 Adamson Road, Swiss Cottage. Their first child, Edith Halina (Mrs Charles Baty), had been born in December 1898 and their second, Robert Alexander, in March 1901.

The summers of 1901, 1903 and 1904 were spent in Poland and it was here that some of his most colourful work was produced. The influence of Gauguin was a key role in Bevan's development, helping him to discover the pure colour which led him to a premature Fauvism in 1904. His Courtyard of that year has been described as "one of the first exercises in the expressive use of pure colour in this century". Bevan's early experiments in colour can also be seen in his The Mill Pool which recalls the Talisman picture that Sérusier painted to Gauguin's instructions and was described as being "quite different in colour and really rather superior". However his first one-man exhibition in 1905, which contained probably the most radical paintings by a British artist at that time, was not a commercial success and was hardly noticed by the critics. "Bevan evidently lost confidence in the direction it pointed and never again produced so outstanding a painting of this type. Sir Philip Hendy, in his preface to the 1961 Bevan retrospective exhibition at Colnaghi's, commented that Bevan was perhaps the first Englishman to use pure colour in the 20th Century. He was certainly far in advance of his Camden Town colleagues in this respect."

Bevan's second exhibition, in 1908, of largely Sussex scenes included the first of his paintings in the divisionist or pointillist style of which the best examples are Ploughing on the Downs (Aberdeen Art Gallery) and The Turn-Rice Plough (Yale Center for British Art).

In the same year Bevan submitted five works to the first Allied Artists' Association in London's Albert Hall—a non-juried, subscription show founded by Frank Rutter to promote progressive artists and based on the French Salon des Indépendants. (Wassily Kandinsky showed in England for the first time at the second exhibition in 1909.)

Having worked largely in isolation since returning from Pont-Aven, Bevan's paintings were noticed by Harold Gilman and Spencer Gore and he was invited to join Walter Sickert's Fitzroy Street Group. It was Sickert who encouraged him to "paint what really interests you and look around and see the beauty of everyday things". Thus began a series of paintings recording the decline of the horse cab trade, for example The Cab Horse (Tate gallery).

== Camden Town Group ==
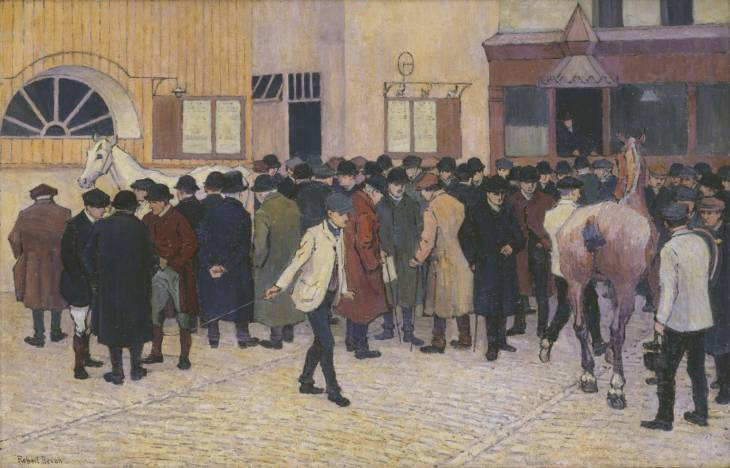
Horse Sale at the Barbican, 1912

In May 1911 the decision was made to form a new exhibiting society from the ranks of Fitzroy Street and so the Camden Town Group was founded. The end of that year saw Bevan moving away from the portrayal of the cab yards to the London horse sales at Tattersalls, Aldridges, the Barbican, and Wards (see Horse Sale at the Barbican, Tate Gallery and Under the Hammer, Walker Art Gallery, Liverpool).

The Camden Town Group was short-lived. After three financially unsuccessful exhibitions Arthur Clifton, who ran the Carfax Gallery, declined to hold any more. However he still continued to back individual members and Bevan had his third one-man show there in 1913.

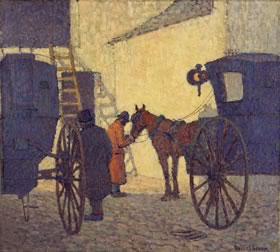
The Cabyard, Night, 1910

In 1913, The Cabyard, Night, the only painting by Bevan acquired for a public collection during his lifetime, was bought by the Contemporary Art Society on Frank Rutter's recommendation that they should obtain it for the nation before a more discerning collector bought it.

William Marchant, of the Goupil Gallery, offered his larger premises on condition that the Group was expanded and that it changed its name. This resulted in the formation of the London Group in the autumn of 1913. Harold Gilman was elected president, J.B. Manson secretary and Bevan treasurer.

From April 1914 until September 1915 Bevan rented a studio in Cumberland Market, London's hay and straw market in Camden Town. It was here that the Cumberland Market Group consisting of Bevan, Gilman, Charles Ginner and John Nash held Saturday afternoon 'at homes'. The four exhibited at the Goupil Gallery in May 1915 and were later joined by Edward McKnight Kauffer and C.R.W. Nevinson.

== Last years ==
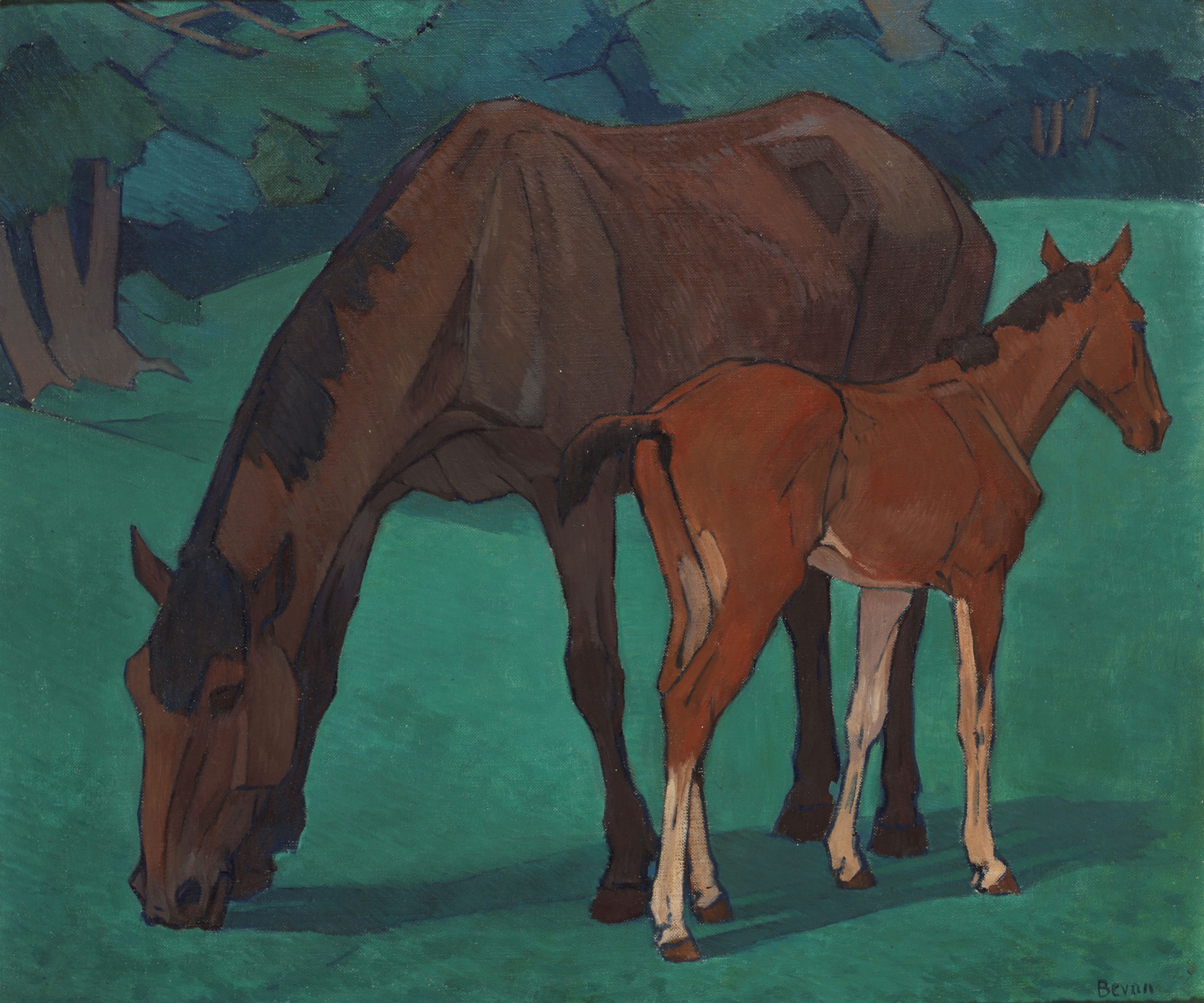
Mare and Foal, 1917

Bevan spent most of his summers painting. Until the First World War this was usually at family homes in Poland or Sussex. However, at about this time, he was first invited down to the Blackdown Hills on the Devon-Somerset border as a guest of landowner and amateur artist Harold Harrison. Until the end of his life Bevan continued to paint in the Bolham valley and nearby Luppitt his angular style sitting well with the strong patterning of the landscape.

His London street scenes, which were largely in the area of St John's Wood and Belsize Park, were generally more favourably reviewed than his landscapes.

After a break of nearly twenty years Bevan returned to lithography. Whilst his earlier prints recall landscapes by Van Gogh the later works are more in the nature of tone translations of oil paintings. "In either instance they are technically superb and notable additions to English lithography of the period."

In 1922 he was elected to the New English Art Club.

Bevan died on 8 July 1925, following an operation for stomach cancer.

== Legacy ==
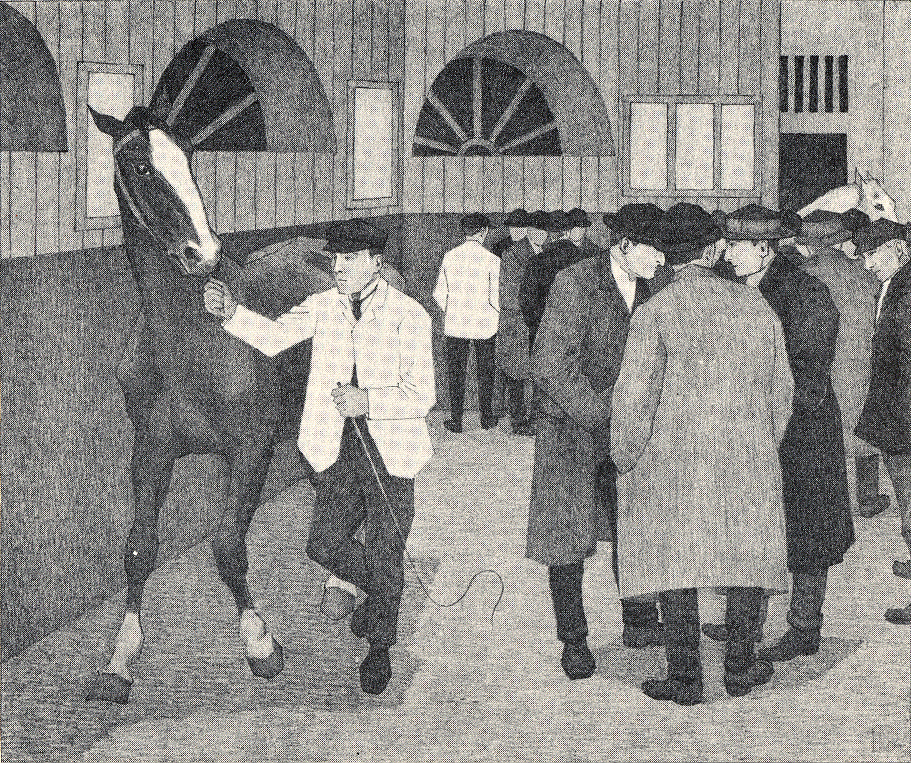
The Horse Mart (Barbican No. 2), 1921. Lithograph.

Despite memorial shows in 1926 and an Arts Council exhibition in 1956, his unique contribution to British art was not widely recognized until 1965, the centenary of his birth. In that year the artist's son published his memoir and organised a series of exhibitions.

Bevan's modesty and reticence and his "almost complete inability to put himself forward" ensured that most of his works were unsold and a considerable number were left to his wife on his death. Stanislawa Bevan left her estate equally between her son R. A. Bevan and daughter Mrs Charles Baty. In 1961 they presented the Ashmolean Museum, Oxford with The Bevan Gift in honour of their parents' work. As well as a number of paintings, drawings and lithographs this included the 27 surviving Bevan sketchbooks. Further works were added subsequently.

He was one of nine out of the 17-strong Camden Town Group to be shown in a major retrospective of the group at Tate Britain in London in 2008.

Works by Bevan can be found in many public collections in the United Kingdom. He is also represented in public collections in Australia; France; New Zealand; South Africa and the USA.

Robert Bevan was the great grandfather of the historian of architectural paint and colour, Patrick Baty.

== Works on show ==
An exhibition entitled A Countryman in Town: Robert Bevan and the Cumberland Market Group was held at the Southampton City Art Gallery from 26 September – 14 December 2008 and it moved to Abbot Hall Art Gallery from 13 January – 21 March 2009.

More works were seen in an exhibition held at Gainsborough's House, Sudbury, in Suffolk from 4 October to 13 December 2008. The show was entitled From Sickert to Gertler: Modern British Art from Boxted House.

== Gallery ==
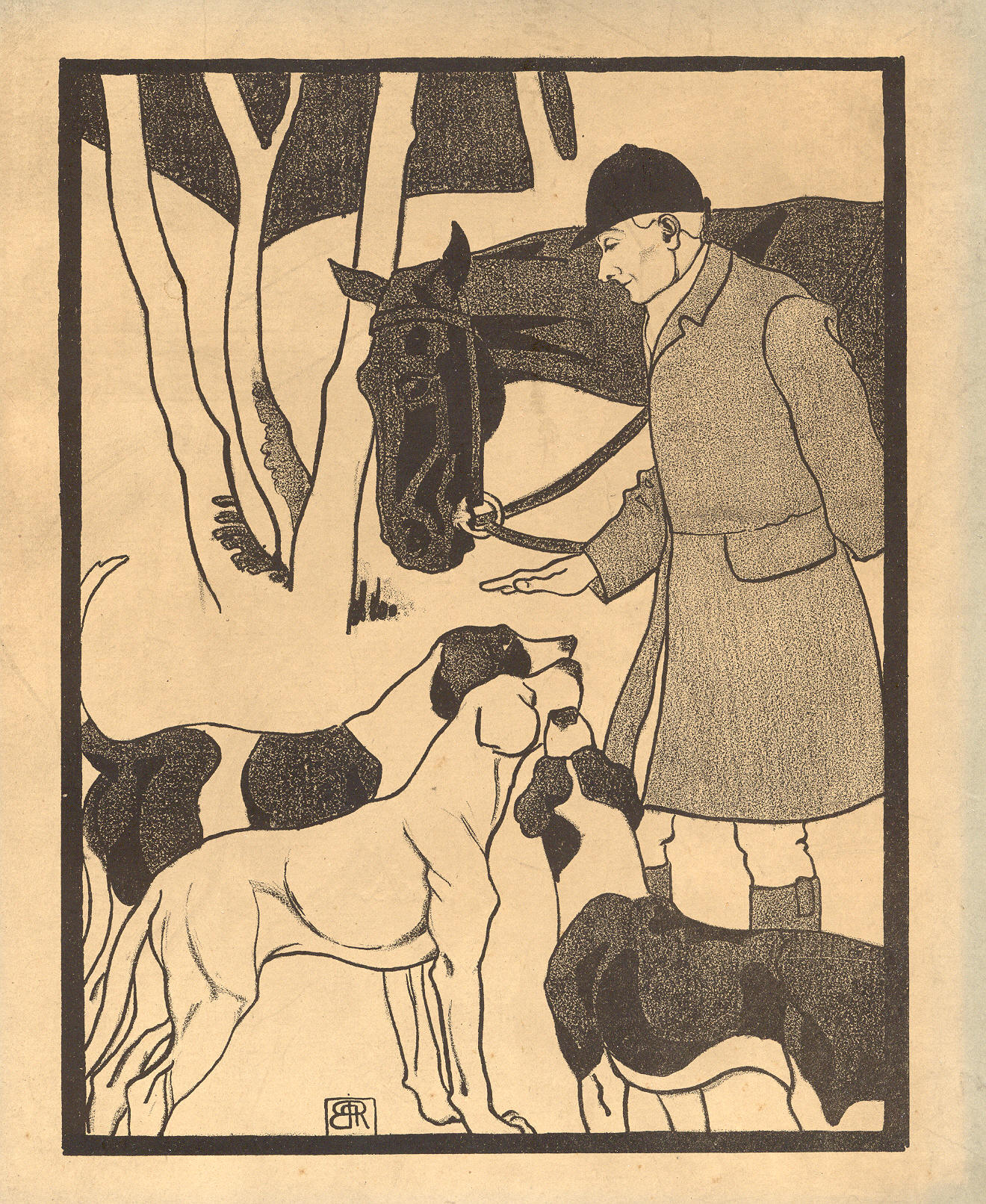
Huntsman & Hounds, 1898

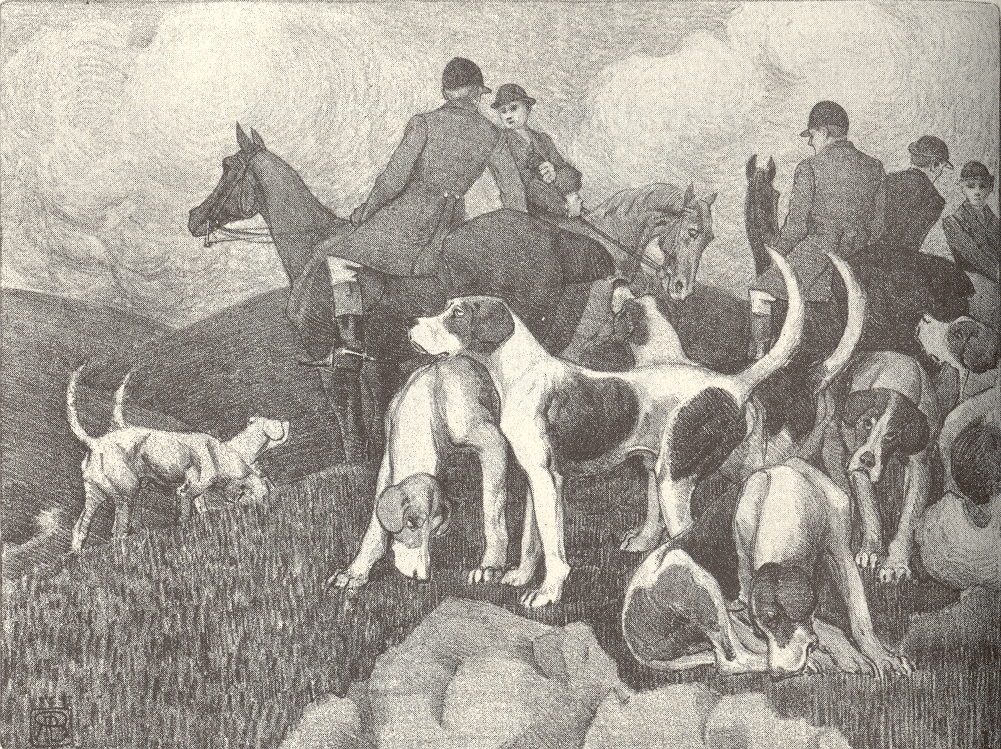
The Meet, 1898

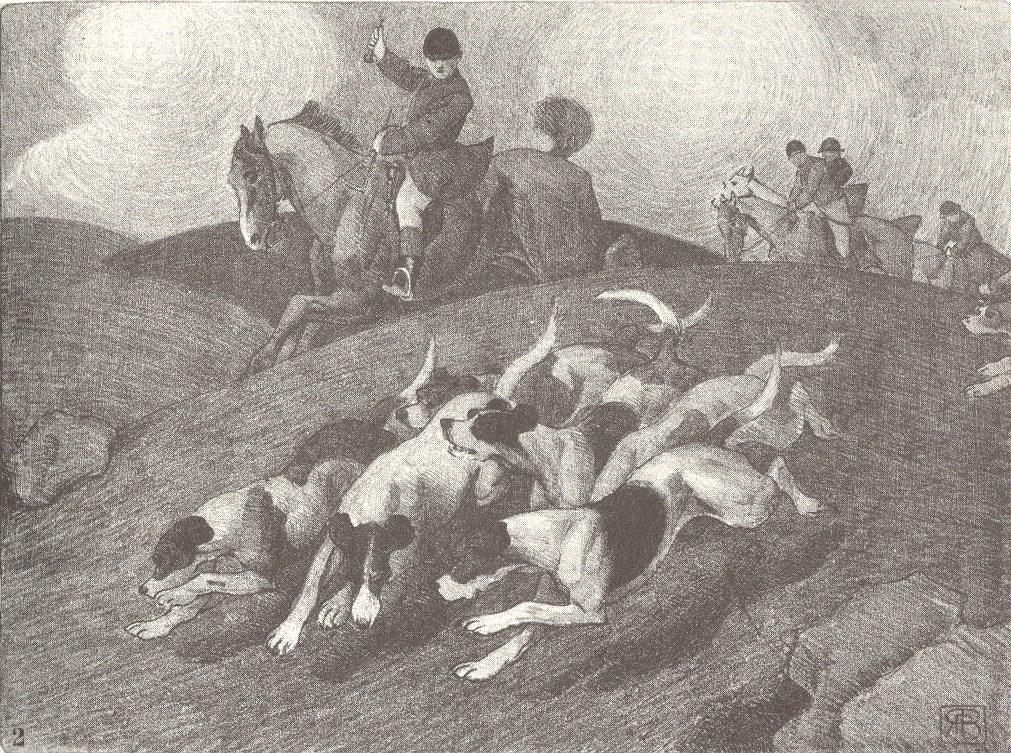
Found, 1898

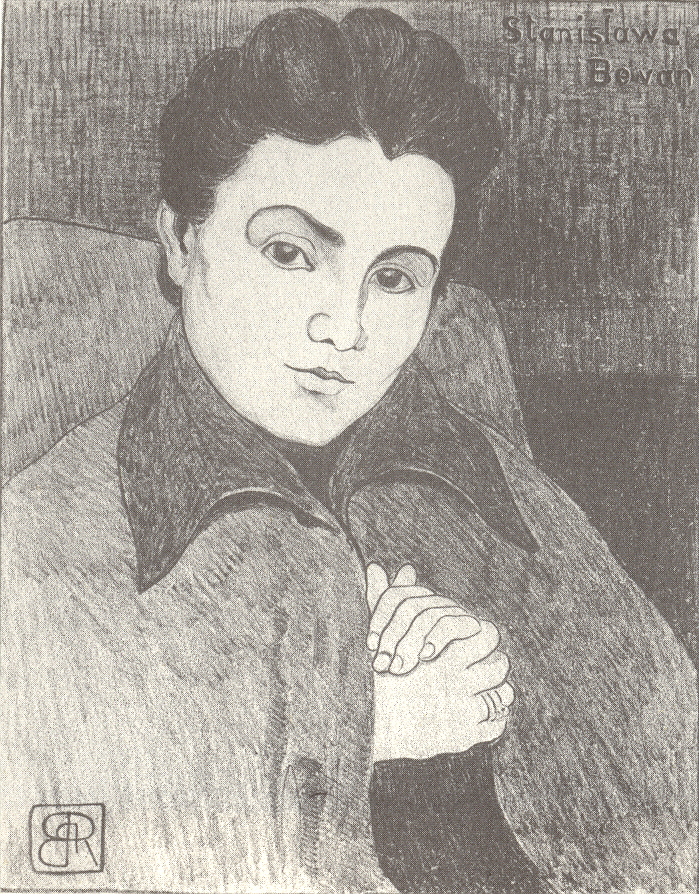
The Artist's Wife, 1898

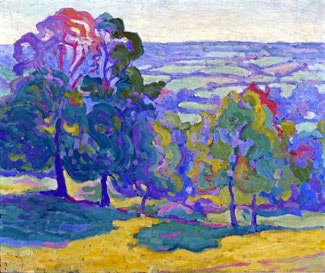
Evening in the Culme Valley, 1912

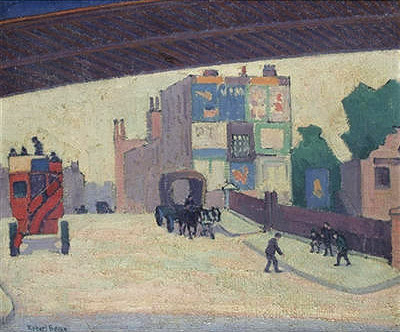
Two Bridges, c. 1912

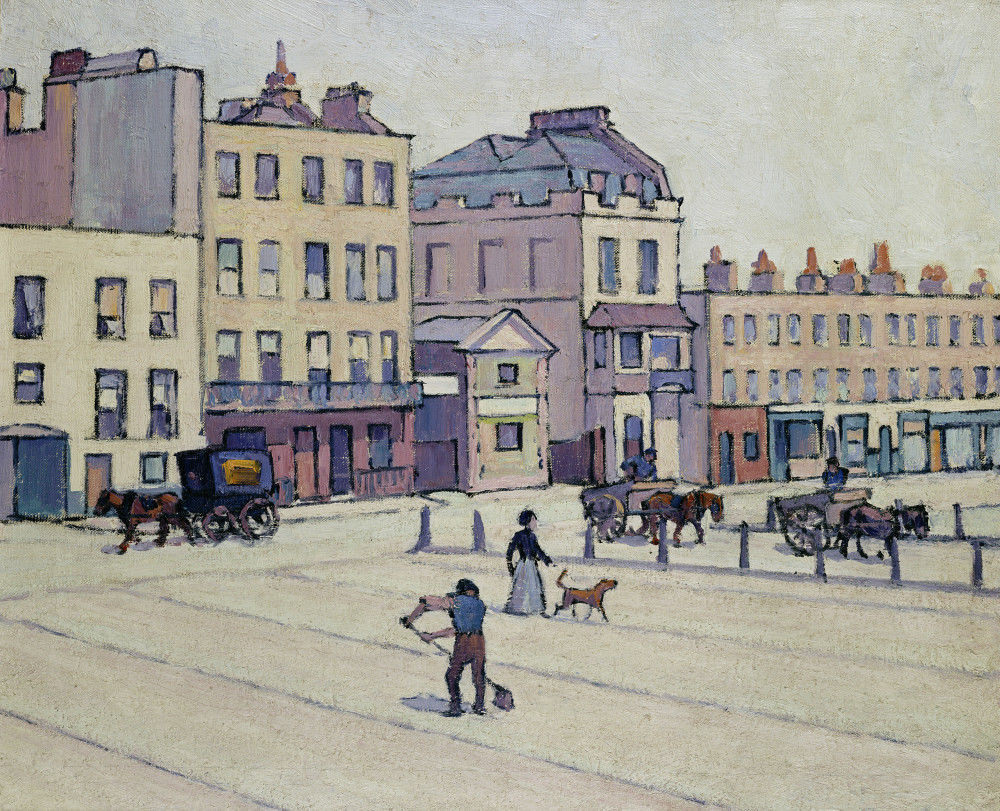
The Weigh House, Cumberland Market, c. 1914

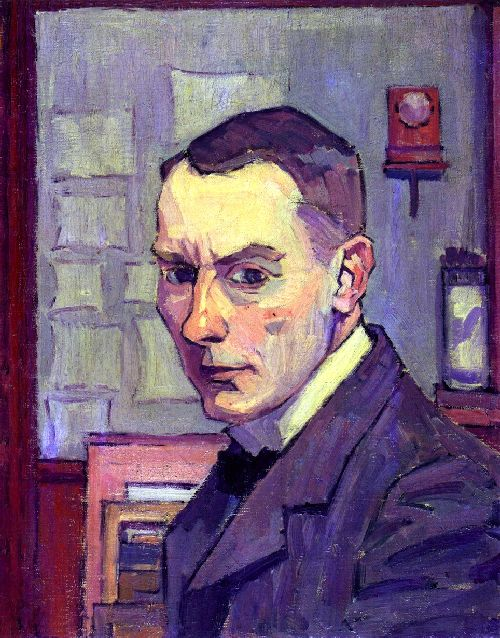
Self Portrait, c. 1914

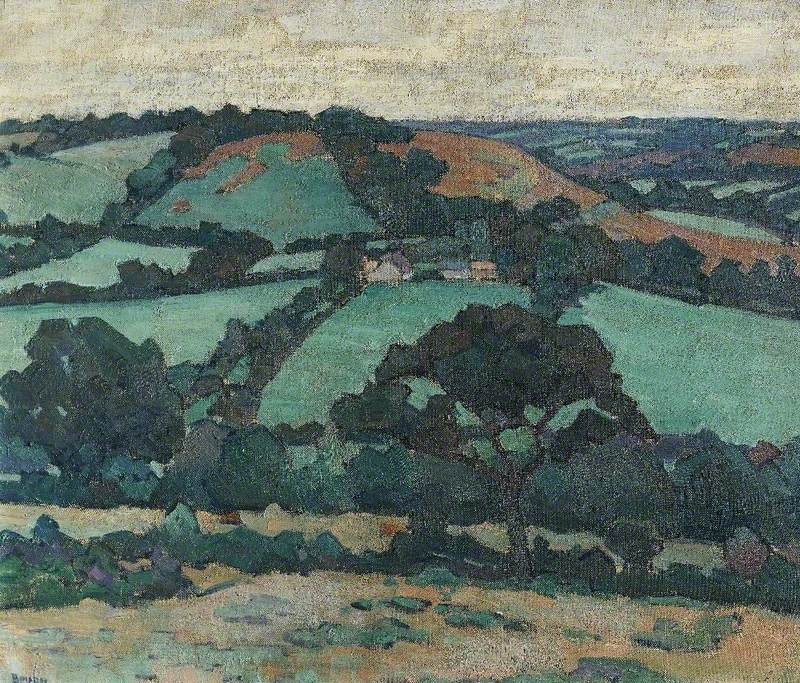
Brimley Hill, Devon, c. 1914-1915

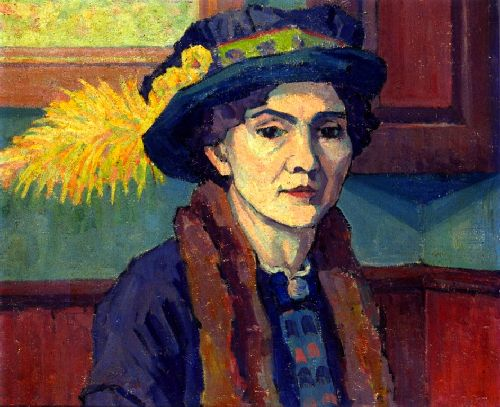
The Feathered Hat, 1915

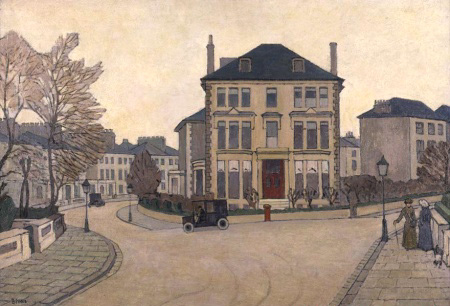
A Street Scene in Belsize Park, 1917

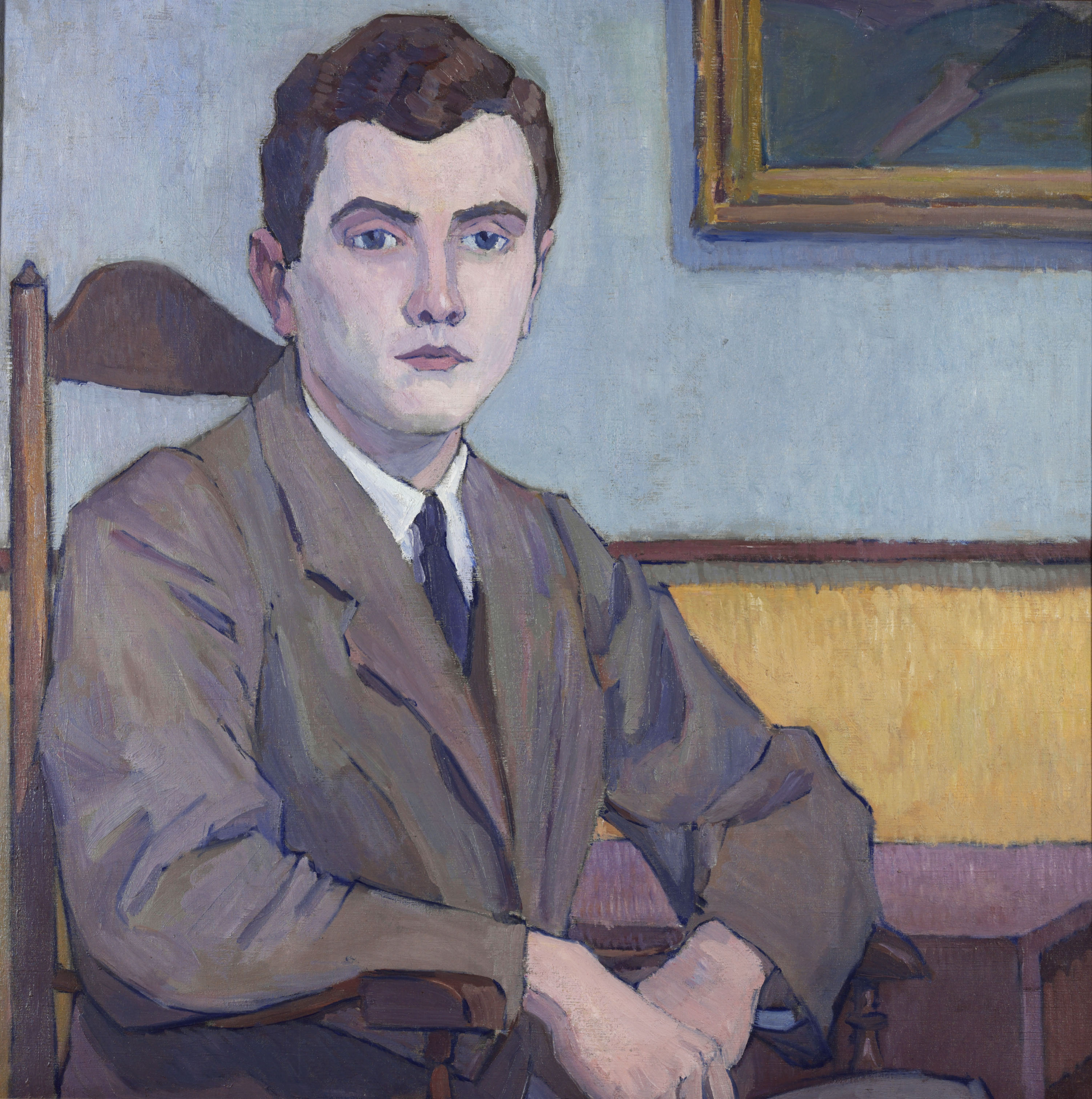
The Artist's Son, c. 1918

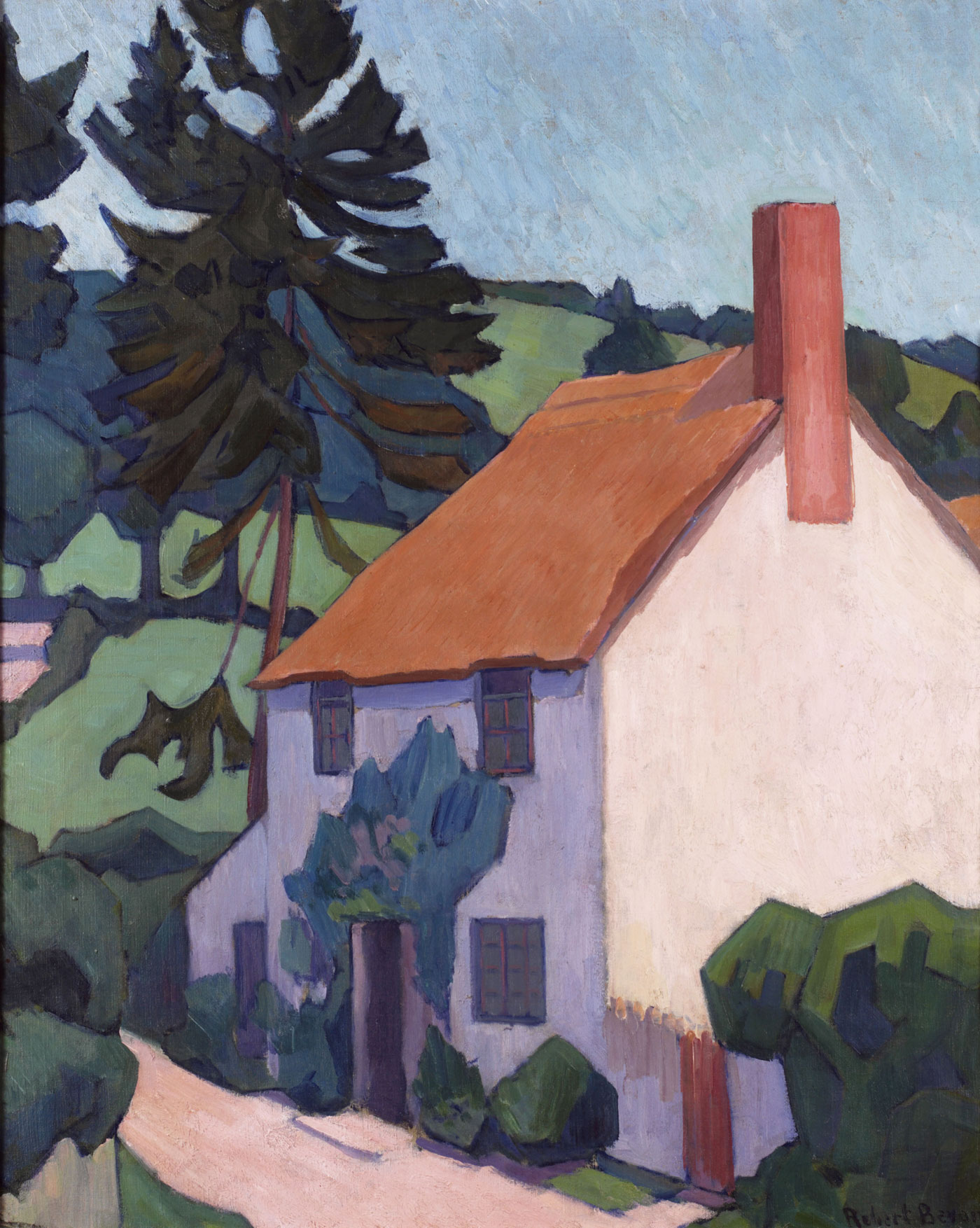
A Devon Cottage, c. 1920

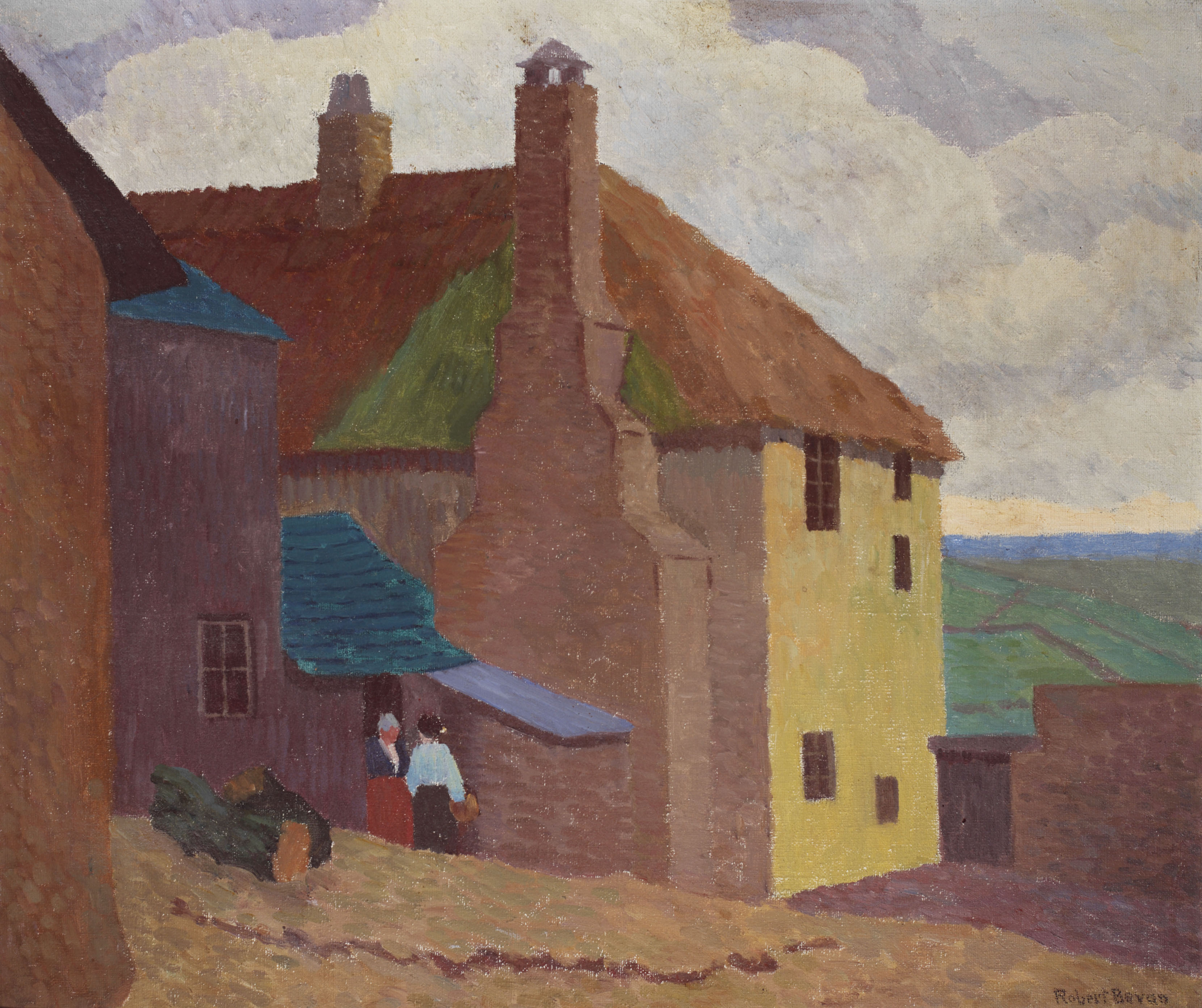
Mount Stephen, 1924

== Bibliography ==
- Robert Bevan, Robert Bevan: A Memoir by his Son. London, Studio Vista. 1965.
- Graham Dry, Catalogue Raisonné of the Prints of Robert Bevan. London, Maltzahn Gallery. 1968.
- Audrey Nona Gamble, A History of the Bevan Family. London, Headley Brothers. 1923.
- Nicola Moorby, 'Robert Bevan 1865–1925', artist biography, February 2003, in Helena Bonett, Ysanne Holt, Jennifer Mundy (eds.), The Camden Town Group in Context, Tate, May 2012, http://www.tate.org.uk/art/research-publications/camden-town-group/robert-bevan-r1105351
- Frances Stenlake, Robert Bevan from Gauguin to Camden Town. London, Unicorn Press. 2008.
- Robert Upstone, Modern Painters: The Camden Town Group [exhibition catalogue, Tate Britain, London], 2008. ISBN 1-85437-781-7.
- J. Wood Palmer, 'A Time to Remember', in The London Magazine; Vol 1 No 12. March 1962.
- John Yeates, NW1. The Camden Town Artists. A social history. Somerset, Heale Gallery. 2007.
