= Patrick Baty =

British historian

Patrick Baty FSA FSA Scot FRSA Hon FBIID (born 1956) is a British historian of architectural paint and colour, who works as a consultant in the decoration of historic buildings.

== Early years ==
He was educated at St Benedict's School, in London, and, after a period as a private soldier in the Parachute Regiment, attended the Royal Military Academy Sandhurst, being commissioned into the 9th/12th Royal Lancers in 1976. He resigned his commission in 1980 when his newly-posted commanding officer opposed his secondment to the Sultan of Oman's Armed Forces. Reverting to the rank of Trooper, he undertook Selection for the Artists Rifles, leaving as a captain some ten years later.

After a brief spell with the Anthony d'Offay gallery he joined his family paint business Papers and Paints. Having always had an interest in historic buildings he began a study of the methods and materials employed in their decoration. In 1993 he completed a part-time degree in the subject at the University of East London.

== Recent career ==
Baty has acted as a consultant on many restoration projects in the United Kingdom. He was a committee member of the Georgian Group and is a Fellow of the Society of Antiquaries of London, the Society of Antiquaries of Scotland, the Royal Society for the encouragement of Arts, Manufactures & Commerce and an Honorary Fellow of the British Institute of Interior Design. Baty was a founding member of both the Traditional Paint Forum and the Architectural Paint Group.

== Projects ==
Projects have ranged from King Henry VIII's heraldic Beasts; Baroque churches; country houses; wartime RAF stations and London housing estates to structures such as Tower Bridge and Holborn Viaduct. He has also worked in the USA.

== Work with colour ==
In the 1980s Baty produced a range of paint colours based on those offered by a Scottish house-painter in 1807. In April 2000, Homes & Gardens described him as being "Undoubtedly the most influential of our (paint) experts…whose breadth and depth of knowledge is unrivalled". He has been employed by ICI (Dulux) and Little Greene to develop ranges of traditional paint colours for English Heritage. Colour ranges have also been produced for the French and German markets. The colours traditionally employed on the exteriors of buildings in Bath, Edinburgh, Penzance and in Gloucester have been investigated for the local planning authorities and guidelines produced for them. The colours used on the exteriors of Chelsea houses in the 19th century have also been identified and an article published for the Chelsea Society. He has worked on a range of exterior colours based on regional use in France. A similar project looking at regional colour in the United Kingdom is in progress.

In 2007 his company, Papers and Paints, was awarded a Royal Warrant for his work with colour.

== Personal life ==
He is married with a daughter and two sons.

Patrick Baty is the great grandson of the artists Robert Polhill Bevan and his wife, Stanisława de Karłowska.

== Lecturing and writing ==
Baty lectures on the general subject of paint and colour of the 18th and 19th centuries. The audiences range widely from the staff of the national amenity organisations, to preservation enthusiasts. He has lectured at universities, to architects on Continuing Professional Development courses, and to conservation officers. He has spoken at international symposia in Europe, and lectured and run courses along the East coast of the United States.

Some of his published works are listed below. He has also contributed to and edited various other books on the subject of paint and colour; on Robert Bevan and also on The Artists Rifles. He has co-curated exhibitions related to the Cumberland Market Group and on works of art produced by members of the Artists Rifles.

== Select bibliography ==
- House Decoration, by Paul Hasluck. An introduction to the facsimile edition. Donhead Publishing, Dorset. 2001.
- "Inspired by the Past?", in John Fowler: The Invention of the Country-House Style. Donhead Publishing, Dorset. 2005. This paper follows the English Heritage/Traditional Paint Forum conference Inspired by the Past that took place in London on 4 July 2001.
- "The Colours] of Chelsea." The Chelsea Society Report, 2003.
- "Exterior Colour on the Smaller Town House" in Materials & Skills for Historic Building Conservation. Blackwell Publishing, Oxford. 2008.
- "Straws from Cumberland Market", in the catalogue for an exhibition of works of art at Southampton City Art Gallery, A Countryman in Town: Robert Bevan and the Cumberland Market Group. 26 September to 14 December 2008.
- "The Colourful Past of the Royal Festival Hall" in Architectural Finishes in the Built Environment. Archetype Books, London. 2009.
- "Paint Colour and Paintwork" in Interior Finishes & Fittings for Historic Building Conservation. Blackwell Publishing, Oxford. 2012.
- (Contribution to) Metals. English Heritage Practical Building Conservation. Ashgate Publishing. 2012.
- The Anatomy of Colour. Thames & Hudson. 2017.
- Nature's Palette. Thames & Hudson. 2021.
- The Regimental Identity. Special Air Service Regimental Association. 2025.
