= Stanisława de Karłowska =

Polish artist (1876–1952)

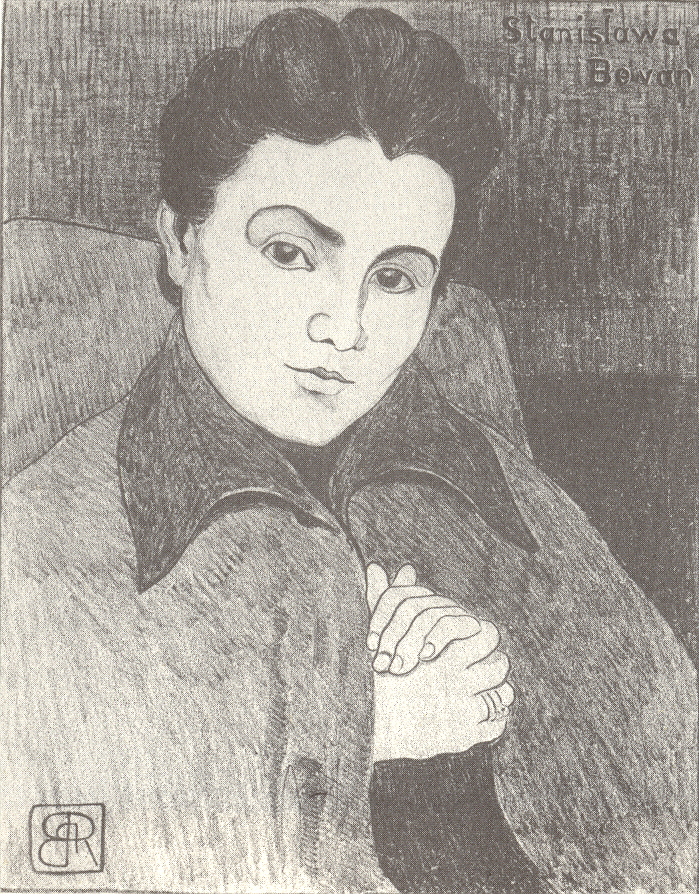
- The Artist's Wife (1898), lithograph, portrait of de Karłowska by Robert Bevan
- Born: 9 May 1876; Wszeliwy, Poland
- Died: 9 December 1952 (aged 76); London, England
- Resting place: Cuckfield, Sussex
- Education: Warsaw
- Alma mater: Académie Julian
- Known for: Painting
- Style: Modernist, Polish folk art
- Movement: The London Group
- Spouse: Robert Bevan

Stanisława de Karłowska (8 May 1876 – 9 December 1952) was a Polish-born artist who was a founder member of the London Group. Her work combined a modernist style with elements of Polish folk art.

== Life and work ==
Stanisława de Karłowska was born in Wszeliwy, in Congress Poland. She was the daughter of Aleksander de Karłowski and Paulina, née Tuchołka. Both parents were descended from the Polish nobility (szlachta) and her father had substantial estates centred on the village of Wszeliwy, near Sochaczew, in the Masovian Voivodeship, Poland. The family had a long history of patriotic activism, her father having fought with Lajos Kossuth and Józef Bem in the late 1840s. He also saw much of his estate sequestered by the Russian authorities after his participation in the January Uprising of 1863.

Soho Square (1936)

Stanisława trained as an artist on the Women's course run by Wiesołowski in Warsaw and exhibited at the Zachęta National Gallery of Art 1895-97, prior to enrolling at the Académie Julian in Paris, in 1896. The following summer she went to Jersey for the wedding of a fellow Polish art student, Janina Flamm and Eric Forbes-Robertson. It was there that she met the English artist, Robert Bevan. At the end of the year she and Bevan were married in Warsaw. They settled in Swiss Cottage, London. She exhibited with the Women's International Art Club and New English Art Club and both exhibited at the Allied Artists' Association in 1908. However, being a woman, she was ineligible for membership of either the Fitzroy Street Group or the later Camden Town Group, of which her husband was a member.

De Karłowska was a founder member of the London Group and exhibited with them throughout her life. Her work combined a modernist style with elements of Polish folk art. In March 1910, Huntly Carter said of it..."what S. de Karlowska has to say she tells us lucidly in pure and harmonious colour."

Stanisława had two children, Edith Halina (Mrs Charles Baty) and Robert Alexander Bevan. Remaining in London after her husband's death in 1925, she spent the war years in Chester. She travelled to Poland until the late 1930s and would holiday with her daughter's family at Pléneuf-Val-André in Northern Brittany and at St Nicolas-du-Pelem, further south. Many of her London and Breton paintings are in public collections.

Stanisława de Karłowska died in London in 1952 and is buried in the Bevan family tomb in Cuckfield, Sussex. In common with her husband, de Karlowska sold few of her works during her lifetime. Her estate, including several hundred of Robert Bevan's paintings, drawings and lithographs were left equally to her two children. Many works were presented to public collections over the following twenty years.

She had one solo exhibition during her lifetime at the Adams Gallery in London, in 1935. Her memorial exhibition was also held there in 1954, and in 1968 a joint Bevan - de Karłowska show was held at the Anglo-Polish Society, London.

Stanisława de Karłowska was the great-grandmother of the historian of architectural paint and colour, Patrick Baty. A second cousin was Blessed Maria Karłowska.

== Works in public collections ==
- Aberdeen Art Gallery
- Brighton Museum and Art Gallery
- Fitzwilliam Museum, Cambridge
- National Museum of Wales, Cardiff
- Towner Gallery, Eastbourne
- Kelvingrove Art Gallery, Glasgow
- Huddersfield Art Gallery
- University of Hull Art Collection
- The Coach House, Kettering
- Leeds City Art Gallery
- Museum of London
- Tate Britain
- Manchester Art Gallery
- Nottingham Castle Museum
- Ashmolean Museum, Oxford
- Plymouth City Museum and Art Gallery
- Southampton City Art Gallery
- Swindon Museum and Art Gallery
- The Hepworth Wakefield Art Gallery
- Worthing Museum and Art Gallery
- York City Art Gallery
- Nelson Mandela Metropolitan Art Museum, Eastern Cape, South Africa

== Gallery of works by the artist ==
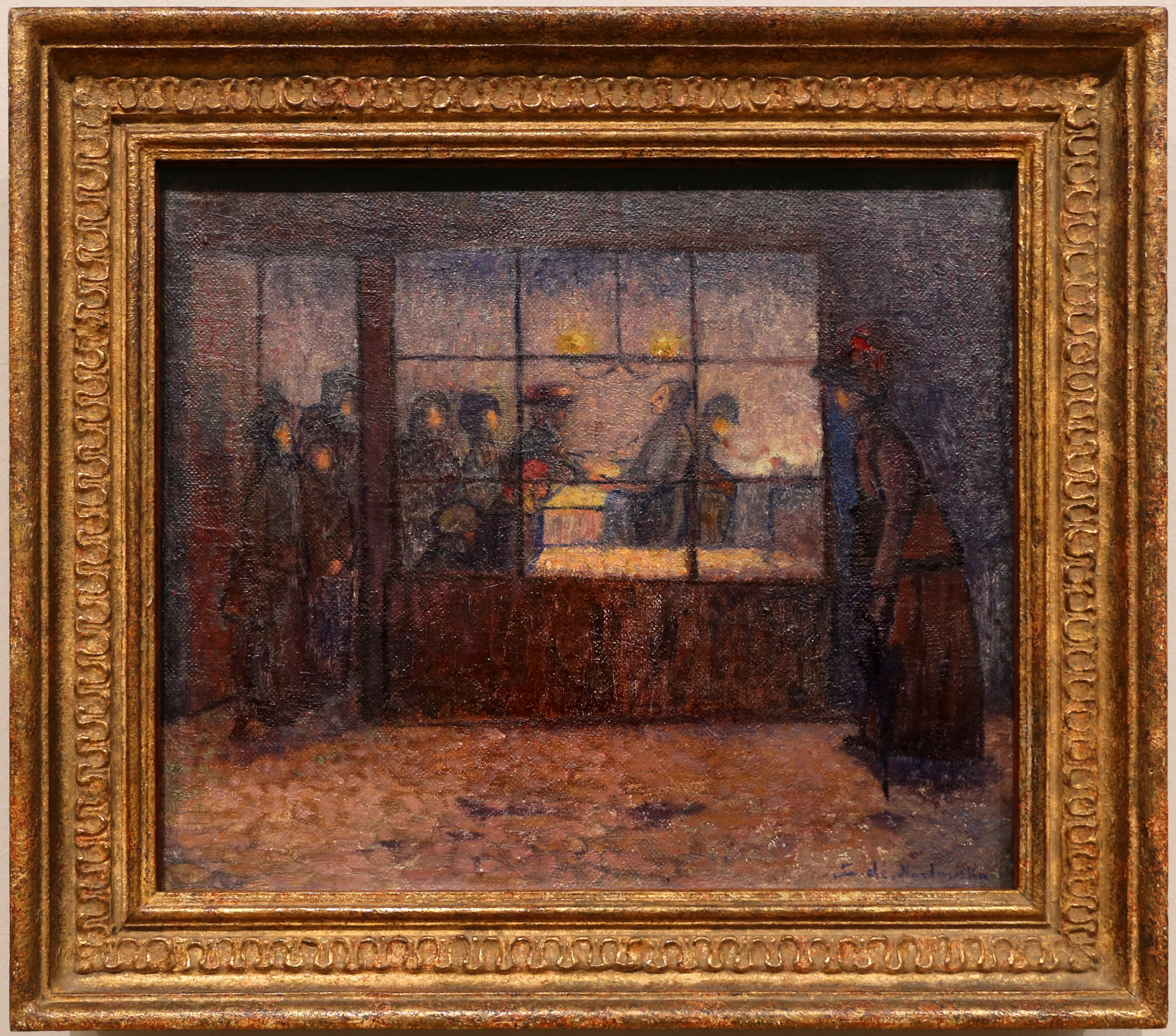
Fried Fish Shop (ca. 1907), Tate Britain, London

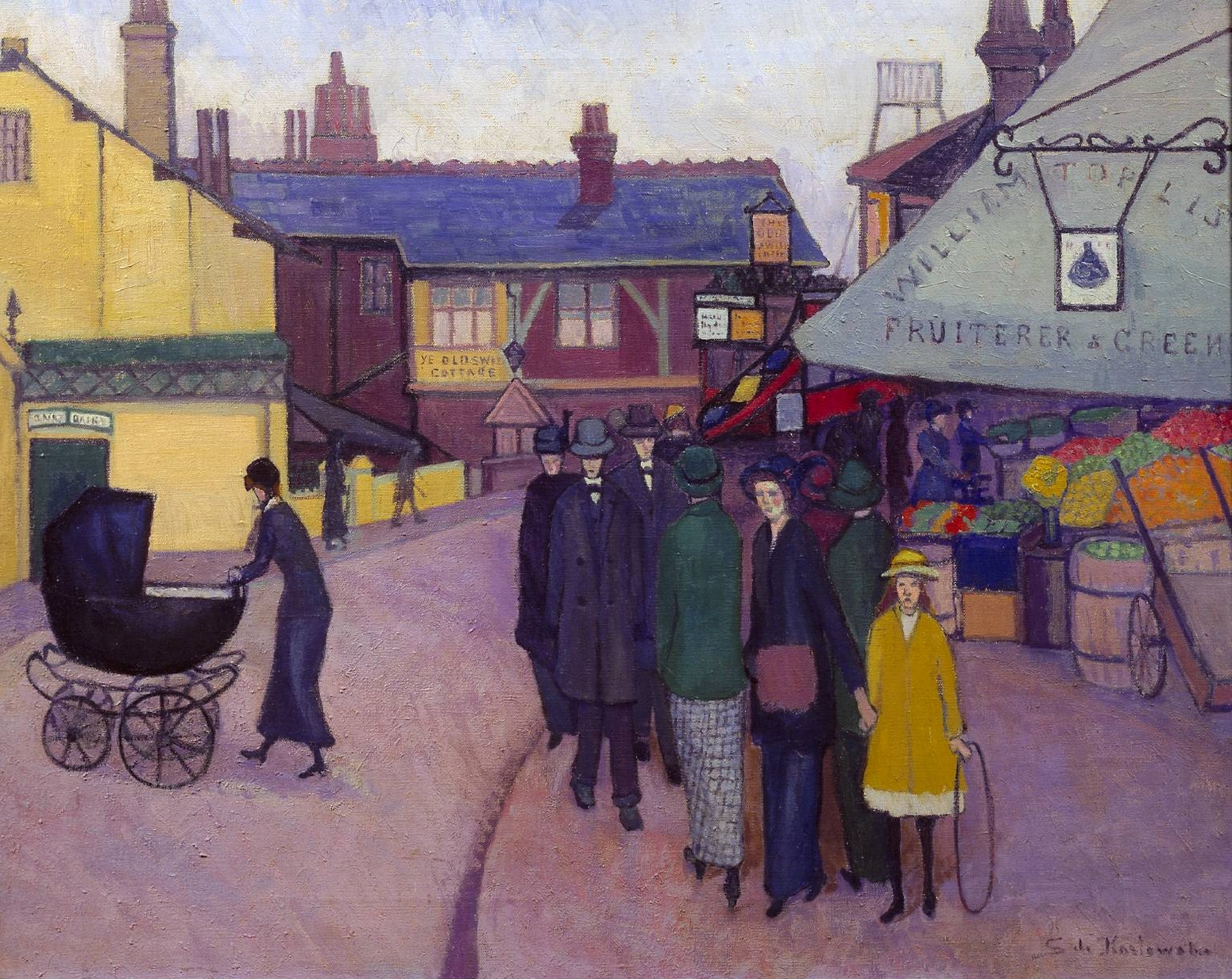
Swiss Cottage (ca. 1914)

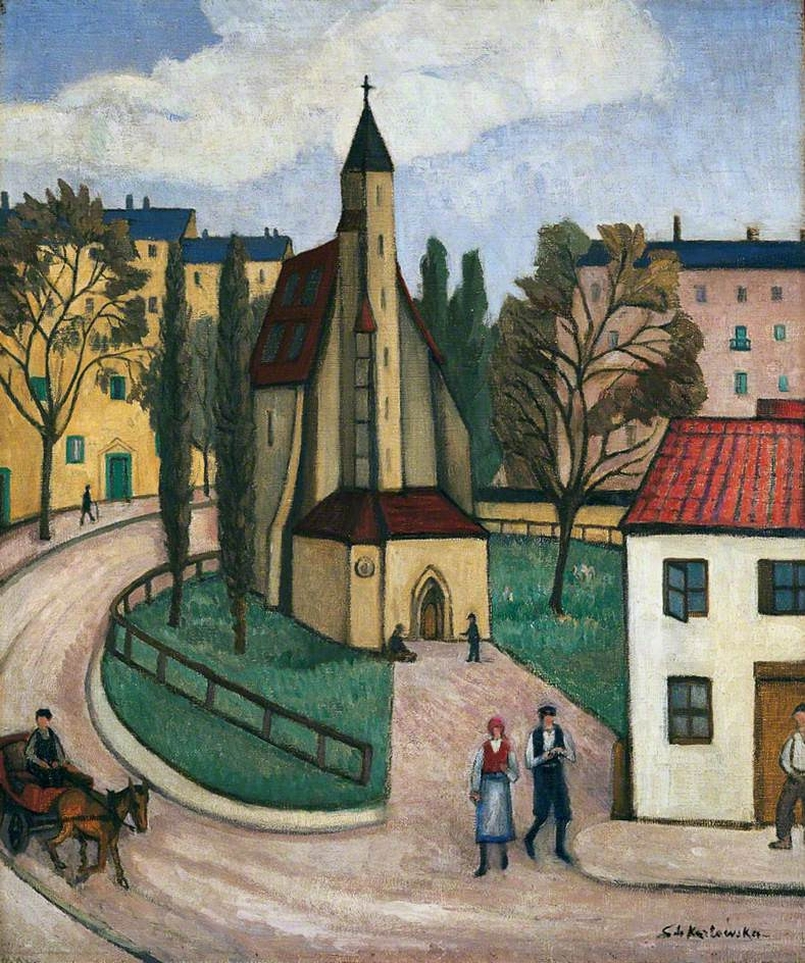
Church of the Holy Cross, Cracow (1936), The Hepworth Wakefield, United Kingdom

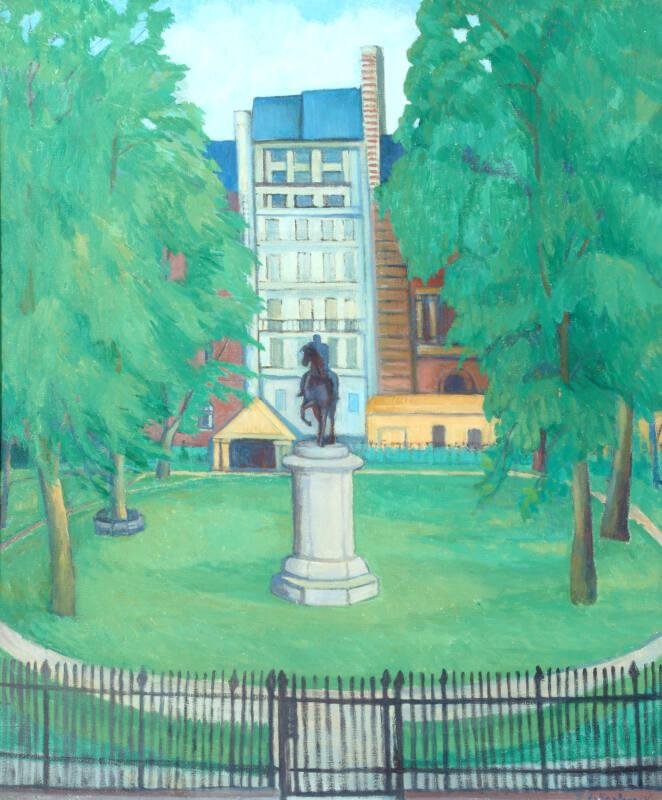
St James's Square

== Portraits and photos of the artist ==
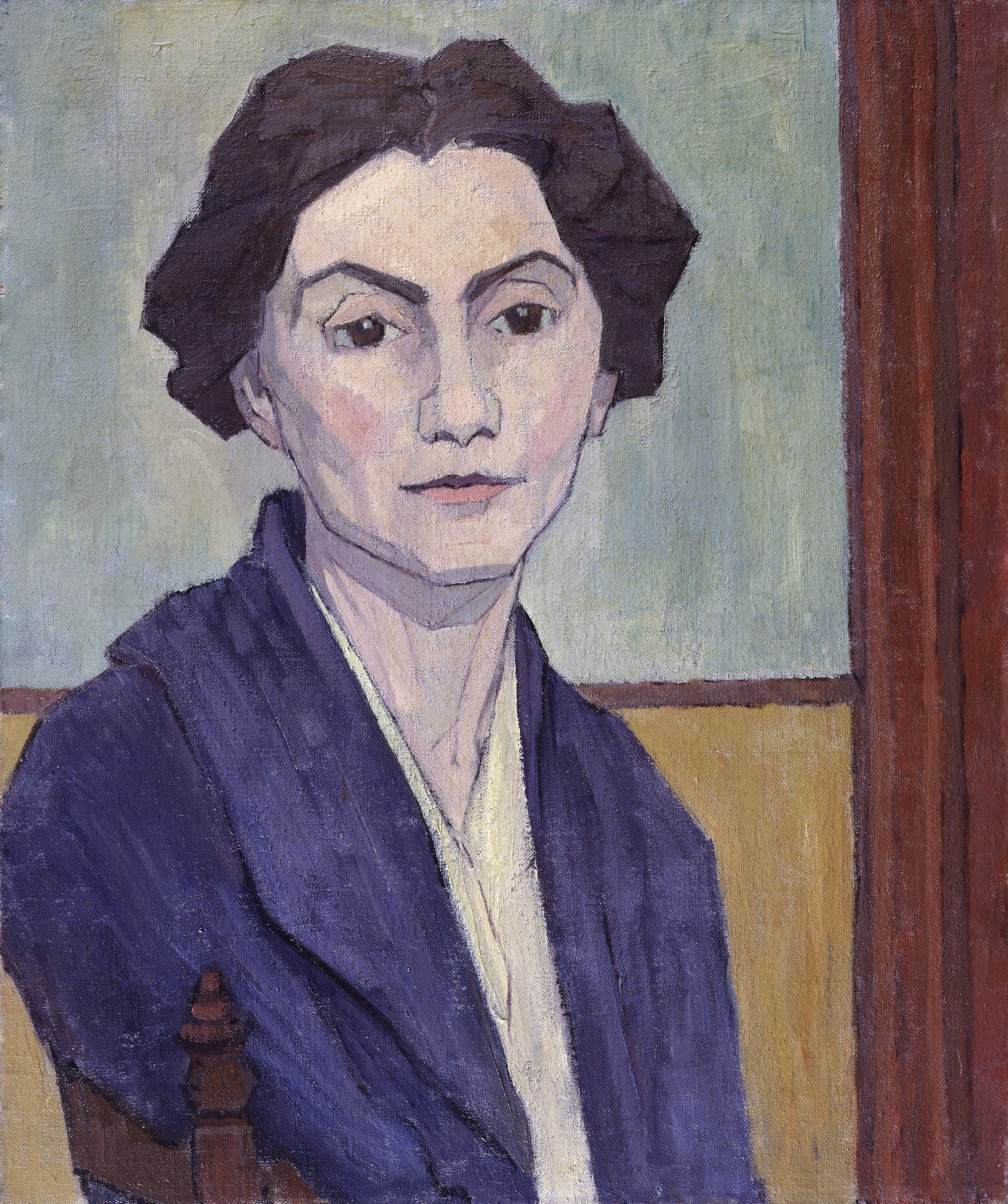
Stanislawa de Karlowska, by Robert Bevan, National Portrait Gallery, London

Stanislawa de Karlowska (Bevan) ca. 1900, from the family photo collection

== See also ==
- Poles in the United Kingdom
