= Morgan W. Phillips =

American historian

Morgan W. Phillips (1943–1996) was an American founder of the field of architectural conservation. He is credited with coining the term "architectural conservation" in the early 1970s and was among the first to call himself an architectural conservator. Phillips worked for most of his career at the Society for the Preservation of New England Antiquities (SPNEA) in Boston, now Historic New England, and the organization's Conservation Center was largely built around his research and that of his apprentices.

Phillips pioneered a number of techniques that would subsequently become standard in the field, including the microscopic examination of historic paint layers, the use of epoxies for wood repairs, and the acrylic consolidation of fragile historic material. He and Andy Ladygo perfected an acrylic injection technique for re-attaching historic plaster walls and ceilings to wooden laths. His contributions to historic paint analysis ranged from developing the technique of 'cratering' using sandpaper (to macroscopically reveal multiple paint layers), to the microscopic evaluation of paint cross-sections in situ and in the laboratory, to techniques meant to reverse the natural yellowing of linseed oil and thus reveal the 'true' colors of historic paints. Phillips was also among the first to investigate the properties of historic mortars, convening a landmark conference on the subject in Boston in 1973.

== Early career ==
An undergraduate at Yale, Phillips went on to become one of the first graduates from Columbia University's pioneering MA program in Historic Preservation, founded in 1964 by James Marston Fitch. He began his career at SPNEA in the late 1960s as a Curatorial Assistant, and by 1971 was Supervisor of Buildings. With no formal training in science, technology, or craftsmanship, he sometimes referred to himself as an "alchemist". His expertise in architectural conservation developed largely through self-teaching and contacts made with art conservators, and in response to the necessity of preserving over 30 historic houses, dating from the 17th century to the 1930s, for which he was initially responsible. In time, and particularly as a result of his publications, coupled with the rise of the historic preservation movement in the 1970s, Phillips began to be in demand nationally as a consultant. This led SPNEA to establish a "Consulting Services Group" in 1974, built largely around his expertise and reputation, but also offering the services of an historical architect, Maximilian Ferro; a preservation scientist, Norman Weiss; and an architectural historian, Rick Detwiller; with David M. Hart as Director of Consulting Services, and initially headquartered at the Society's Harrison Gray Otis House in Boston. Dr. Judith Selwyn, a materials scientist, joined the Group as an intern, as did researcher Sarah Chase. This Consulting Group worked closely, successfully pioneering the concept of multidisciplinary historic preservation services. In February 1977, however, the SPNEA became concerned with the liability of providing professional services as a non-profit, and Maximilian Ferro (under whose name and license all construction contracts were signed), was spun off to form The Preservation Partnership, a private multi-disciplinary firm. Dr. Selwyn followed later, forming her own consultancy in Preservation Science, while Sarah Chase, Rick Detwiller, David M. Hart, and Norman Weiss all pursued successful private practices.

== Later career ==
By the mid-1980s Phillips had trained or attracted a number of other conservators to SPNEA, including Andy Ladygo, Brian Powell, and Gregory Clancey. The Consulting Services Group became the SPNEA Conservation Center, moved to the Lyman Estate in the Boston suburb of Waltham. Never an administrator, Phillips always concentrated on research and consulting. While the Center continued to be profitable, it never regained the prominence it had when administering architectural projects, and never again enjoyed the full support of the SPNEA, After protracted bureaucratic battles, it eventually closed in the early 1990s. Phillips went into private practice in Canajoharie, New York, but during a trip to examine Mayan ruins in Guatemala, he developed a ringing in his ears that exacerbated his long-standing struggle with manic depression. Phillips committed suicide at his home in Canajoharie, New York, in 1996.

== Family ==
Phillips never married. He had an older brother, Reverend Wendell R. Phillips, and a sister, Andre Phillips. His nephew is the musician Jon Lindsay.

== Bibliography ==
- "Wooden Roof Framing in America, 1800-1875" (unpublished MA thesis, Columbia University), 1968 (71 pp.)
- Phillips, Morgan W. (1971). "The Philosophy of Total Preservation". Bulletin of the Association for Preservation Technology. 3 (1): 38–43. JSTOR 27670049.
- Phillips, Morgan W. (1971). "Discoloration of Old House Paints: Restoration of Paint Colors at the Harrison Gray Otis House, Boston". Bulletin of the Association for Preservation Technology. 3 (4): 40–47. JSTOR 27670070.
- Phillips, Morgan W. (1974). "SPNEA-APT Conference on Mortar, Boston, March 15-16, 1973". Bulletin of the Association for Preservation Technology. 6 (1): 9–39. doi:10.2307/1493409. JSTOR 1493409.
- The Morse-Libby Mansion, Portland, Maine: a report on restoration work, 1973-1977 (Washington : Technical Preservation Services Division, Office of Archeology and Historic Preservation, National Park Service, U.S. Dept. of the Interior, 1977)
- (with Judith Selwyn), Epoxies for Wood Repairs in Historic Buildings (Washington: Office of Archeology and Historic Preservation, Heritage Conservation and Recreation Service, U.S. Dept. of the Interior, Technical Preservation Services Division, 1978)
- Phillips, Morgan W. (1978). "Brief Note on the Subjects of Analysing Paints and Mortars and the Recording of Moulding Profiles". Bulletin of the Association for Preservation Technology. 10 (2): 77–89. doi:10.2307/1493613. JSTOR 1493613.
- The Eight Most Common Mistakes in Restoring Houses (and how to avoid them), [Nashville: American Association for State and Local History, 1979] Series:Technical Leaflet (American Association for State and Local History), no. 118
- Phillips, Morgan W. (1980). "Adhesives for the Re-Attachment of Loose Plaster". Bulletin of the Association for Preservation Technology. 12 (2): 37–63. doi:10.2307/1493739. JSTOR 1493739.
- (with Andrew L. Ladygo), Phillips, Morgan W.; Ladygo, Andrew L. (1980). "A Method for Reproducing Lincrusta Papers by Hand". Bulletin of the Association for Preservation Technology. 12 (2): 64–79. doi:10.2307/1493740. JSTOR 1493740.
- "Notes on a Method for Consolidating Leather", Journal of the American Institute for Conservation, Vol. 24, No. 1 (Autumn, 1984), pp. 53–56
- "Alkali-soluble Acrylic Consolidants for Plaster: a preliminary investigation", Studies in Conservation, Vol. 32, No. 4 (November 1987), pp. 145–52
- "A Victorian Trompe L'Oeil: The Restoration of Distemper Paints" in Roger Moss, Paint in America (New York: John Wiley & Sons, 1994)
- Phillips, Morgan W. (1995). "Aqueous Acrylic-Epoxy Consolidants". Bulletin of the Association for Preservation Technology. 26 (2–3): 68–75. doi:10.2307/1504487. JSTOR 1504487.
