= Arthur Ernest Pearce =

English sculptor and ceramic artist (1859–1934)

Arthur Ernest Pearce (1859–1934) was a British sculptor and ceramic artist.

He was born in Clapham, London in 1859. His father was an architect. He studied at the Kensington School of Art in London and then at Doulton's ceramics factory in London. This factory had been established by John Doulton in 1815. It was there that he began to design large terracotta sculptures.

He is most famous for the large terracotta fountain located in Glasgow Green. A smaller version is located in the Dunville Park, Falls Road, Belfast.
