= Frank S. Welsh =

American businessman

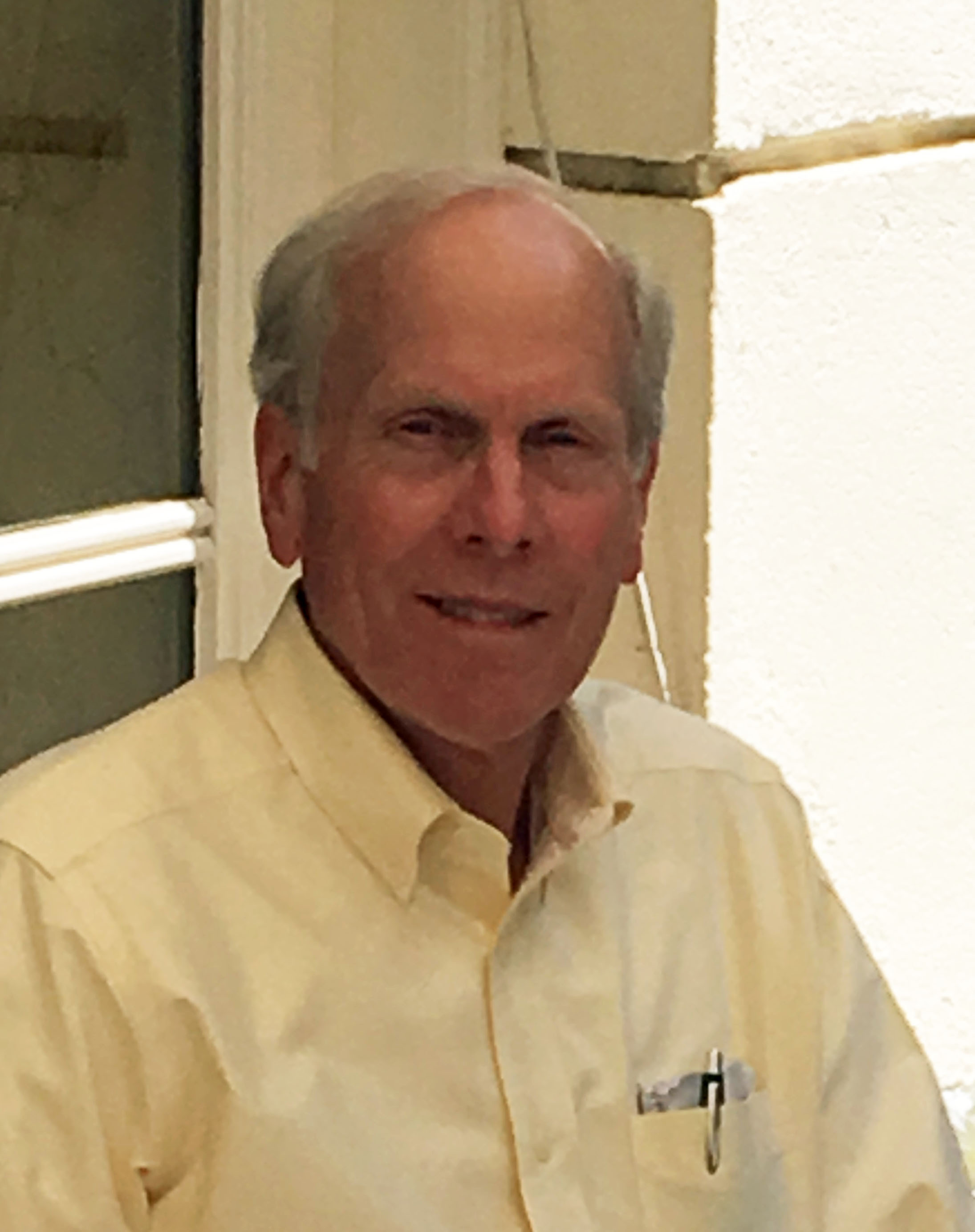
- Madrid, Spring 2016
- Born: February 11, 1950 (age 76); Ardmore, Pennsylvania
- Education: University of Valladolid, West Chester University
- Known for: Historic paint analysis
- Website: www.welshcolor.com

Frank Sagendorph Welsh (born February 11, 1950) is president of the U.S.-based Frank S. Welsh Co. (formerly Welsh Color and Conservation, Inc.), a company that analyzes old paints and wallpapers; their pigments and fibers.

Welsh grew up in Ardmore, Pennsylvania and graduated from West Chester University in 1970. He is the second son of James Conwell Welsh and Suzanne S. Welsh. After two years with the National Park Service, in 1974 Welsh founded Frank S. Welsh Co., later Welsh Color & Conservation, Inc.

While the majority of his projects have been historic house museums, such as Independence Hall and Monticello and also Colonial Williamsburg, many have been historic railroad stations, churches, schools, lighthouses, bridges, ships, and railroad cars, as well as private residences. His favorite preservation projects include Verdmont in Bermuda, the United States Capitol and Frank Lloyd Wright's Fallingwater. His company has also analyzed paints associated with objects of fine art, such as paintings and antique furniture, for purposes of authentication. He appeared on Fox Business Network's program "Strange Inheritance" featuring his analysis of the paints on a salvaged White House plinth.

In September 2004, Welsh was appointed Research Associate in the Department of Geology at Bryn Mawr College in Bryn Mawr, PA. In 2007 he received the Anne de Fort-Menares Award for his article about an analysis of paint and material in the Mobile, Alabama public library. He received the award again in 2008 for his article "Identification of 1850s Brown Zinc Paint Made with Franklinite and Zincite at the U.S. Capitol".

== Sources ==
- "Paint & Color Restoration," The Old-House Journal, Vol. 3, No. 8, August, 1975.
- Sweeney, Thomas W. "Coats of Many Colors: Frank Welsh Pursues the Paints of History", Preservation News, Washington, D.C., September 1989.
- Elsasser, Glen "Cottage Industry: Restoration detectives get Lincoln summer home off 'most endangered list,' work to put it on visitors' must-see list", Chicago Tribune, Chicago, IL, February 9, 2003.
- Pirro, J. F. "A Colorful Past," Main Line Today, Newtown Square, PA, September, 2005.
- Smith, Jada F. "Want a Real Old White House Memento? Warning: It Won't Be Cheap", The New York Times, New York, NY, August. 10, 2015.
