= Roger W. Moss Jr. =

American architectural historian (1940–2025)

- Born: January 31, 1940; Zanesville, Ohio, US
- Died: February 8, 2025 (aged 85)
- Education: Ph.D.
- Alma mater: University of Delaware
- Occupations: Historian; Library administrator
- Employer: The Athenæum of Philadelphia
- Known for: Architectural history
- Partner: Gail Caskey Winkler
- Website: Roger Moss official website (Winkler & Moss)

Roger W. Moss (January 31, 1940 – February 8, 2025) was a historian, educator, library administrator and author in Philadelphia, Pennsylvania. Through his long career he was an advocate for the preservation and authentic restoration of historic buildings. For forty years, Moss served as the executive director of the Athenæum of Philadelphia, a special collections library in Center City Philadelphia. Under Moss's guidance, the Athenæum developed an emphasis on architectural history. For 25 of those years, he taught Documentation & Archival Research in the Graduate Program in Historic Preservation at the University of Pennsylvania.

== Early years ==
Moss was born and raised in Zanesville, Ohio, the only child of Roger William Moss and Dorothy Elizabeth Moss (née Martin). He earned his B.S.Ed and M.A. degrees at Ohio University. During the summer of 1962 he was an assistant to the director of the Peace Corps staff preparing the first team destined for Cameroon. While pursuing his Master of Arts degree he was curator of rare books at the Ohio University Library which resulted in his first scholarly publications. In 1964 Moss accepted a teaching fellowship at the University of Delaware, leading to his Ph.D. with a focus on early American history and American Material Culture at the Winterthur Museum. During the summer of 1966 he studied English country houses and collections as an Attingham Trust Fellow. In the subsequent academic year 1967-68, he was an adjunct lecturer in history for the University of Delaware and the University of Maryland extension programs.

== Professional career ==
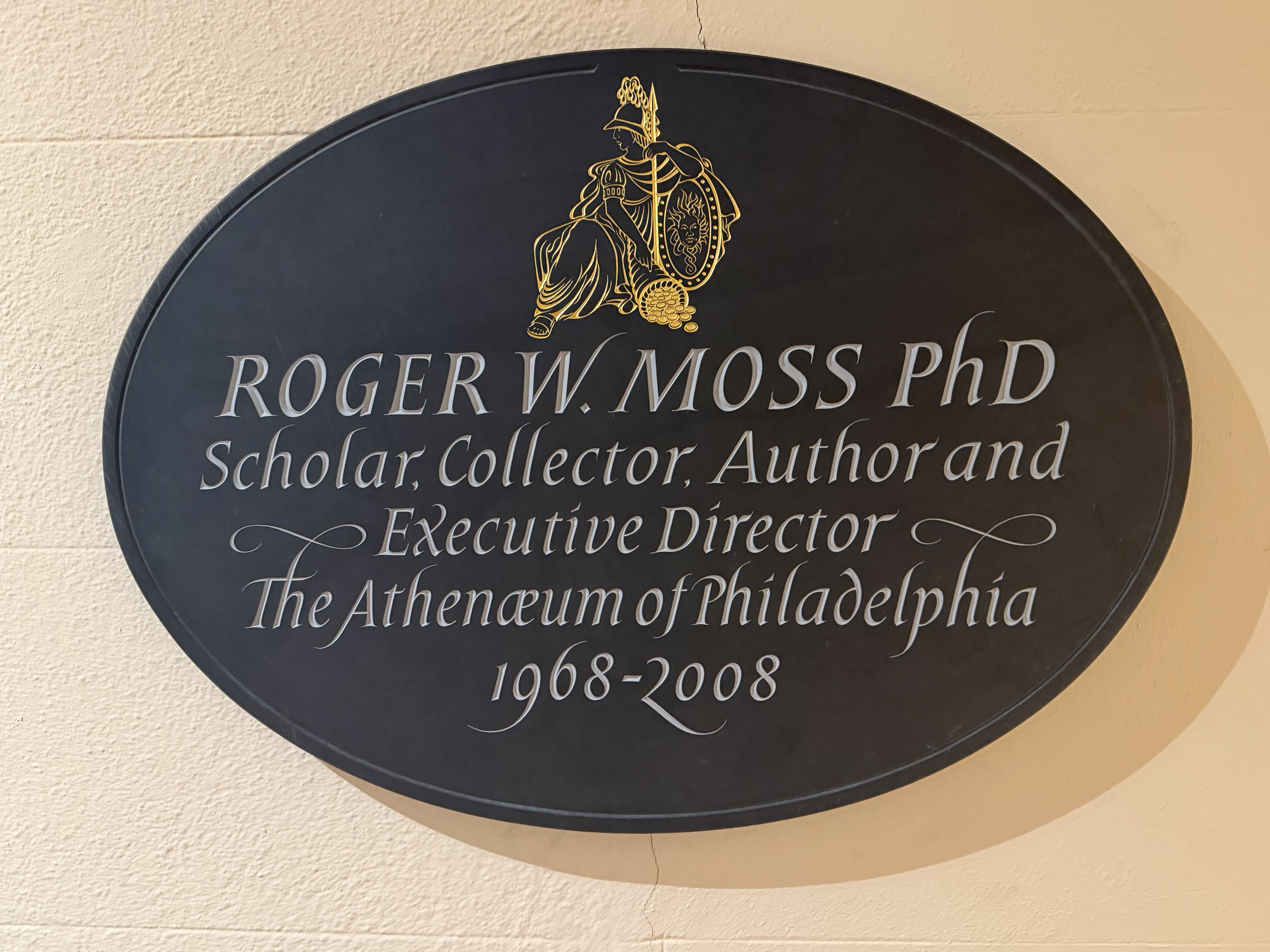
Plaque commemorating Roger Moss's service as executive director at the Athenæum

In 1968 Moss became the Executive Director of The Athenæum of Philadelphia, a member-supported library founded in 1814 and housed in a National Historic Landmark building near Independence Hall. During his four-decade tenure there, he restored and expanded the building and reorganized the nearly moribund institution as an independent research library specializing in American architecture prior to 1930 and nineteenth-century material culture. Under his direction, the research collections in architecture and Victorian-era design rapidly expanded, including the acquisition of the archives of numerous major American architects ranging from Thomas Ustick Walter (1804-1887) to Paul Philippe Cret (1876-1945).

In 1969 Moss became a trustee of the Christopher Ludwick Foundation, one of Philadelphia's oldest philanthropic institutions. It was founded in 1799 to advance the education of the poor children of Philadelphia. He served the foundation as an officer or trustee for forty-six years.

When The Victorian Society in America was founded in 1966, Moss became an early board member and officer. He capitalized on the explosion of popular interest in Victorian architecture and design in the 1970s and 1980s. One of his first actions was to invite the Victorian Society to establish its national office at the Athenæum which provided a base for the nascent society and gave it both national and international visibility for the Athenæum.

Moss was an aggressive collector with remarkable fund raising ability, particularly for the acquisition, conservation, proper housing, and exhibition of architectural records, securing major grants from national, state, and local foundations for those purposes, all on behalf of the Athenæum. He doubled the private library's membership and raised substantial sums to endow the building, staff positions, and programs.

In 1976 Moss launched a publication series to reprint rare Victorian design sources from the Athenæum collection, beginning with Exterior Decoration: A Treatise on the Artistic Use of Colors in the Ornamentation of Buildings originally published in 1885 by the Devoe Paint Company complete with large color plates and authentic paint samples. This reprint became a seminal influence in the nationwide movement to preserve, restore, and authentically repaint Victorian-era buildings.

== Honors and legacy ==
In 1973 Moss was elected a Fellow of the Royal Society for the Encouragement of Arts, Manufactures and Commerce, London, England.

Moss was well known in historic preservation in the U.S. for several decades. He taught at the University of Pennsylvania in the historic preservation program beginning in 1981. His works at the Athenæeum of Philadelphia since 1968 include restoration of the institution's building, and amassing a significant collection of historic architectural drawings and photographs for its library. He wrote numerous books and articles.

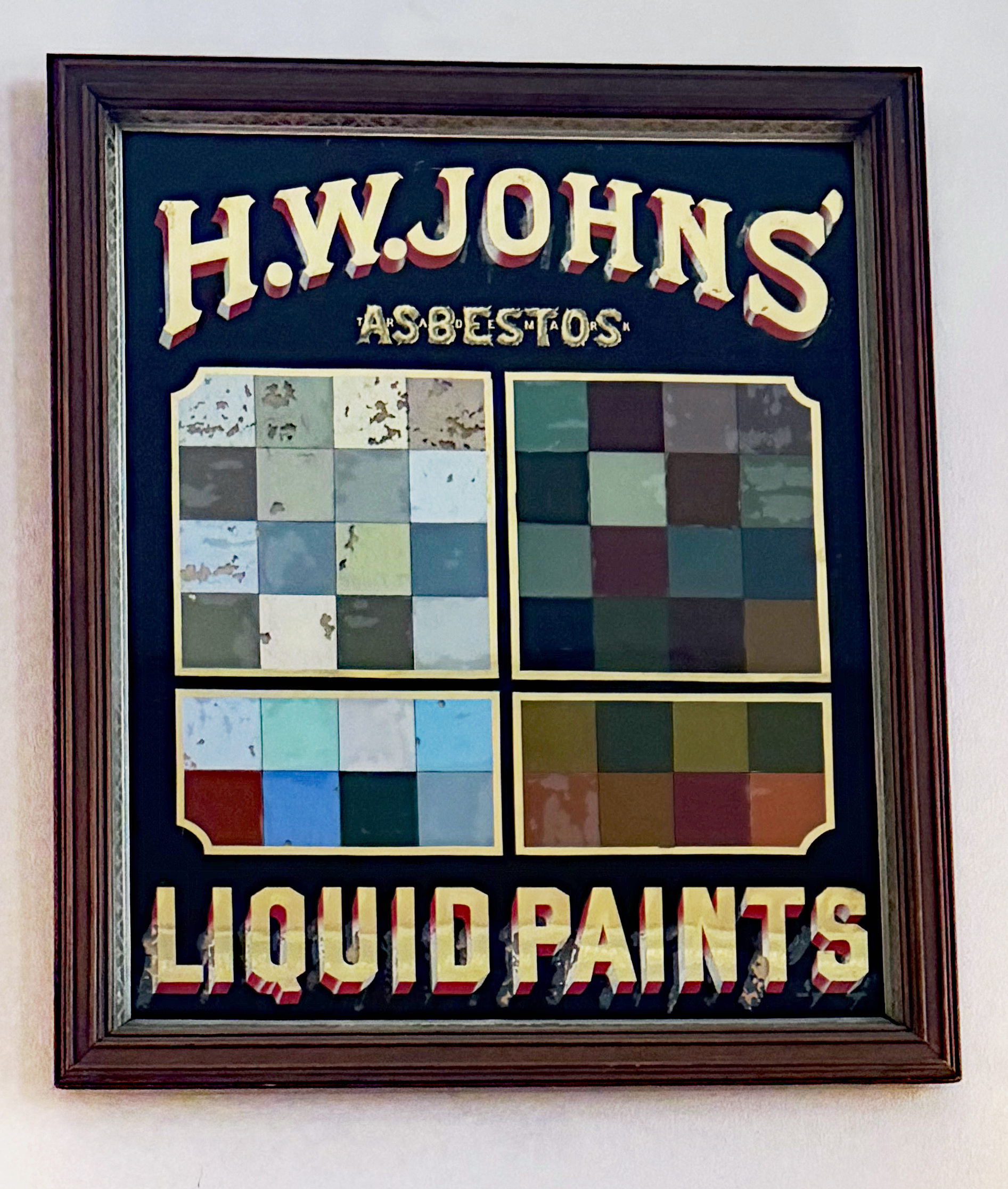
Color palette for H.W. Johns' Liquid Asbestos Paints on display at the Athaneæum

One of Moss's notable contributions to preservationists and architects are his books, publications and collections related to historic American paints and colors. His investigations led to the documentation of the first full line of historic paint colors produced by Sherwin-Williams Paints, the American paint manufacturer.

In November 2025, the Athenæum sponsored the Roger W. Moss Symposium, a two-day symposium to honor the contributions of Moss to historic preservation, which featured presentations by a variety of subject matter experts.

== Representative publications ==
- Moss, Roger W. (1981) Century of Color: Exterior Decoration for American Buildings, 1820-1920, American Life Foundation ISBN 0-89257-051-2
- Tatman, Sandra L., and Roger W. Moss (1985) Biographical Dictionary of Philadelphia Architects, 1700-1930, G.K. Hall & Co. ISBN 0-8161-0437-9
- Moss, Roger W. (1990) The American Country House, Henry Holt & Co. ISBN 0-8050-1248-6
- Moss, Roger W. (Ed.) (1994) Paint in America: The Color of Historic Buildings, National Trust for Historic Preservation ISBN 0-89133-263-4
- Moss, Roger W. (1998) Historic Houses of Philadelphia: A Tour of the Region's Museum Homes University of Pennsylvania Press ISBN 0-8122-3438-3
- Moss, Roger W. (2004) Historic Sacred Places Of Philadelphia, University of Pennsylvania Press ISBN 0-8122-3792-7
