= Malcolm Drummond =

English artist

Drummond c. 1925

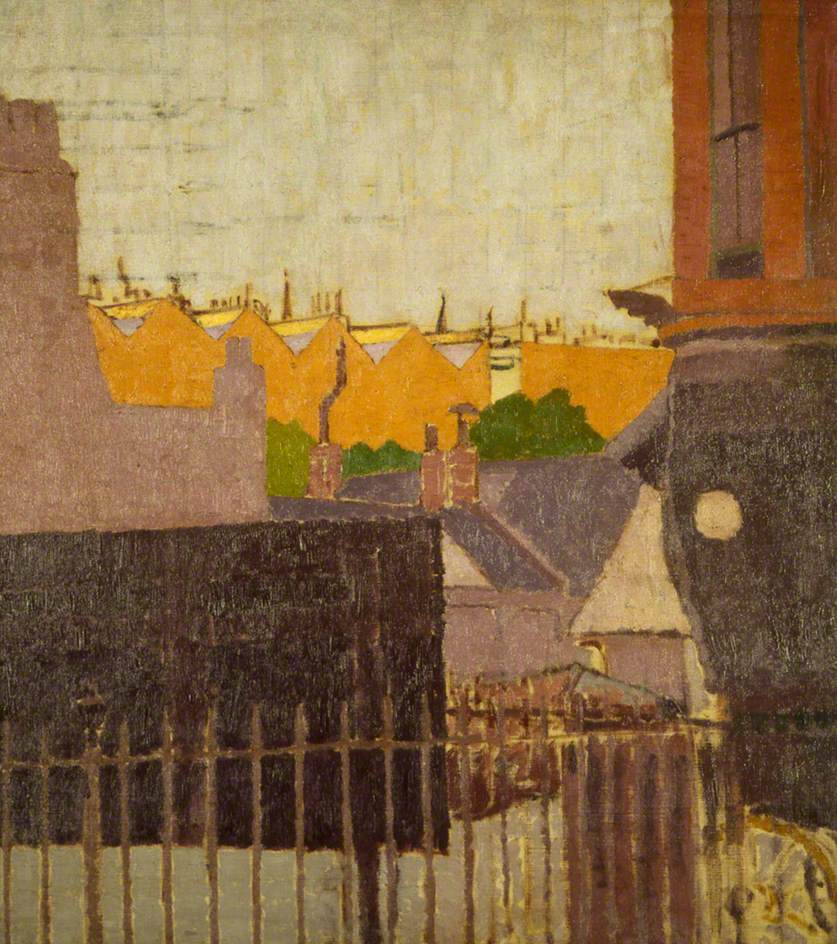
Backs of Houses, Chelsea, 1914

Malcolm Cyril Drummond (24 May 1880 – 10 April 1945) was an English painter and printmaker, noted for his paintings of urban scenes and interiors. Influenced by the Post-Impressionists and Walter Sickert, he was a member of the Camden Town Group and the London Group.

== Life ==
Drummond was born at Boyne Hill, near Maidenhead, Berkshire, the son of Rev. Canon Arthur Hislop Drummond (1843–1945) and Anna Harriet Dodsworth, educated at the Oratory School in Edgbaston, Birmingham and at Christ Church, Oxford, where he studied history. After a year working for Lord Faversham as an estate manager he studied at the Slade School of Art from 1903 to 1907, and under Walter Sickert at the Westminster School of Art from 1908 to 1910. A member of Sickert's Fitzroy Street Group formed in 1907 in a house opposite Sickert's own studio. They met once a week every Saturday, shared easels and critically studied each other's work. The group also included at different times, Spencer Gore, Harold Gilman, Nan Hudson, Ethel Sands, Walter Russell, William Rothenstein, and Albert Rutherston. It was the first of a succession of such collectives that sustained painters throughout the 20th century that concentrated their efforts on contemporary abstract style and method.

He was afterwards a founding member with the Camden Town Group from 1911 to 1913 set up to put on exhibitions. Tensions had always existed in the group between Sickert and those who protested about his lady friends. One effect of the exclusion of women was to increase the output of London landscape scenery while experimenting with intense colouration. Drummond was also a founding member of the London Group in 1914, serving as its treasurer in 1921 and exhibiting with it until 1932. The two years after the Great War were very productive for Drummond: he painted a number of scenes in the Hammersmth Palais de Danse and the London Law Courts. A special commission arose for the Sacred Heart altarpiece of St Peter's, Edinburgh. Another catholic image at Church of the Holy Name, Birkenhead for the Stations of the Cross was finished in 1926.

He taught at Westminster School of Art until he left London to return to Berkshire in 1931 following the death of his first wife Zina Lilias Ogilvie who was also a talented artist/illustrator working under the pen name of Alexina. She illustrated, amongst others, A General History of the Pirates by Captain Charles Johnson, edited, with a Preface, by Philip Gosse printed by The Cayme Press. Zina was also a concert pianist who had performed at The Wigmore Hall and was much admired by Walter Sickert and Clive Bell. Malcolm and Zina shared a passion for art and music and worked together in Malcolm's studio as well as performing musical soirees together at home, Malcolm accompanying Zina on violin. In 1937 he lost the sight of one eye, completing losing his sight by 1942.

The Arts Council put on a retrospective show in London from 1963–4.

== Some of his works ==
  - 19 Fitzroy Street, oil, Tyne & Wear Museum Service In A Chelsea Garden, oil, private collection of painter-printmaker great grand daughter Fiona McIntyre ARE, (/Fiona Mary Elspeth MacIntyre/; born 7th April 1963)

== Bibliography ==
- Nicola Moorby, 'Malcolm Drummond 1880–1945', artist biography, May 2003, in Helena Bonett, Ysanne Holt, Jennifer Mundy (eds.), The Camden Town Group in Context, Tate, May 2012, http://www.tate.org.uk/art/research-publications/camden-town-group/malcolm-drummond-r1105356
- Robert Upstone, Modern Painters: The Camden Town Group, exhibition catalogue, Tate Britain, London, 2008 ISBN 1-85437-781-7
