= Walter Bayes =

English painter and illustrator (1869–1956)

- Born: Walter John Bayes; 31 May 1869; St Pancras, London, England
- Died: 21 January 1956 (aged 86); United Kingdom
- Education: Westminster School of Art; Académie Julian
- Known for: Painting, drawing

Walter John Bayes (31 May 1869 – 21 January 1956) was an English painter and illustrator who was a founder member of both the Camden Town Group and the London Group and also a renowned art teacher and critic.

== Biography ==
=== Early life ===
Bayes was born in St Pancras, London, the second of four children to Alfred Walter Bayes, a painter and etcher who exhibited regularly at the Royal Academy, and Emily Ann Fielden. Walter's sister, Jessie, was a designer in the Arts and Crafts style and his younger brother was the sculptor Gilbert Bayes. Walter Bayes attended the Quaker School at Saffron Waldon. While there, he and E.V. Lucas and Graham Hill started a periodical broadsheet.

He then attended University College School before beginning work in a solicitor's office. He did not enjoy the work and in 1886 began to take evening classes at the City and Guilds of London Institute in Finsbury before studying full-time at the Westminster School of Art. In 1894 he spent a short period of time studying at the Academie Julian in Paris.

=== Career ===
By the turn of the century Bayes had already exhibited a landscape painting at the Royal Academy, in 1890, and had exhibited at the New English Art Club in 1892. Later during the 1890s Bayes began teaching, first at the City and Guilds of London Institute, later at Bolt Court School of Art and then at the Camberwell School of Arts and Crafts. He also started writing on art theory and criticism with regular columns in Outlook, Saturday Review and Weekend Review. He continued to paint, mostly landscapes in oil and watercolour but also developed an interest in theatre design. The first work by Bayes purchased by a major British gallery was Top o' the Tide which the Walker Art Gallery acquired in 1900. In 1901 he had painted scenes for a production Henrik Ibsen's John Gabriel Borkman and in 1911 would exhibit both costume and scenery designs. In 1906 Bayes became the art critic of Athenaeum in place of Roger Fry.

In 1908 Bayes was one of the initial eighty artists to join the Allied Artists' Association formed by Frank Rutter. At the first Allied Artist's Association exhibition Bayes met Walter Sickert, who invited him to attend the regular weekly meetings of the Fitzroy Street Group. When the Camden Town Group was formed in 1911, Bayes was ideally placed to become one of its founding members, as they also met frequently at Sickert's studio. Bayes exhibited work at all three Camden Town Group exhibitions and, in 1913, became a founding member of the London Group. He also exhibited at the Franco-British Exhibition of 1908. In the 1910s, a constant theme of Bayes's work were direct oil sketches of his wife and his sons.

=== World War I ===
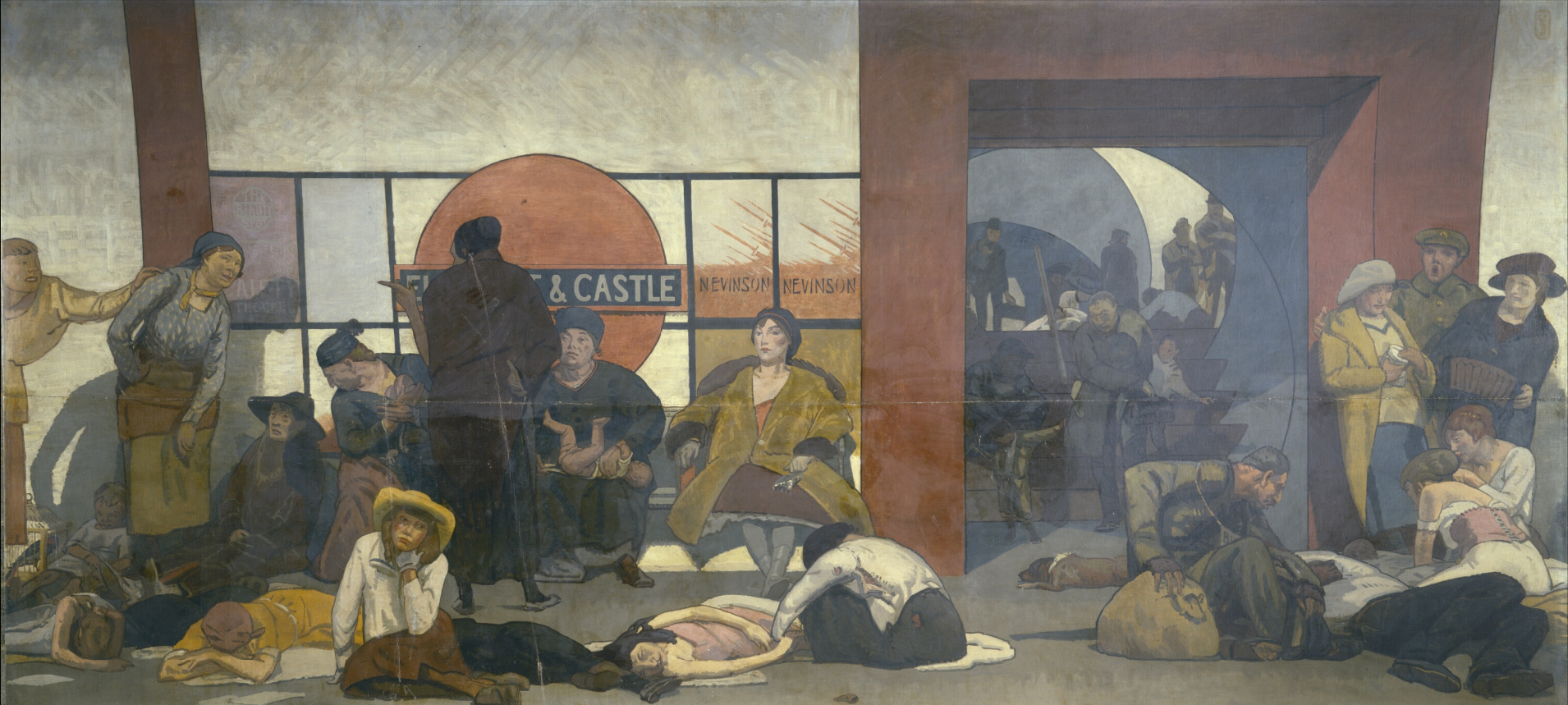
The Underworld: Taking cover in a Tube Station during a London air raid (1918) (Art. IWM ART 935)

During World War I, Bayes continued to teach at the Camberwell School of Arts and Crafts, which was close to the Elephant & Castle tube station on the London Underground. This was to be the site of one of Bayes's best known works, The Underworld: Taking cover in a Tube Station during a London air raid. The scale and composition reflects Bayes's pre-war work as a theatre designer and creates the impression that the viewer is passing through the station, and past the cast of characters on the platform, as if on a train. The picture was shown at the 1918 Royal Academy show and purchased by the Imperial War Museum, who asked Bayes if he would do a further work for the Ministry of Information. Bayes spent some time in Devon in 1918 preparing for what became Landing Survivors from a Torpedoed Ship. This painting was earmarked by the British War Memorials Committee for a proposed, but never built, national Hall of Remembrance. When that project was cancelled the painting was given to the Imperial War Museum but was destroyed by fire in 1977.

=== Later career ===
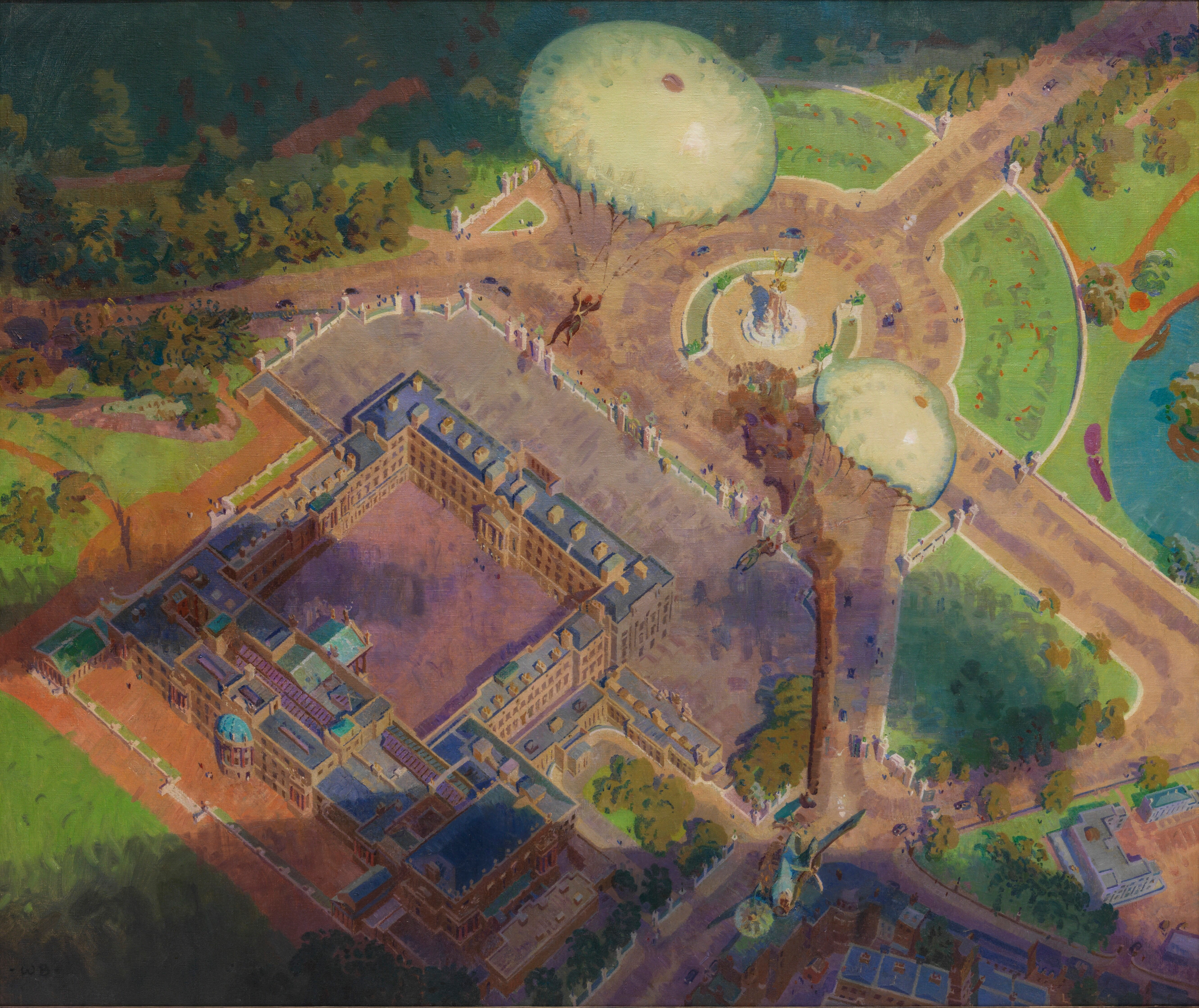
Battle of Britain: Parachutists from an enemy aircraft brought down in an apparent attempt to bomb Buckingham Palace (1942) (Art. IWM ART LD 2514)

In 1918 Bayes was appointed Principal of the Westminster School of Art, a post he was to hold until 1934. From 1927 to 1939 Bayes was a lecturer in Perspective at the Royal Academy Schools and when he left Westminster in 1934 he continued teaching as a visiting lecturer at Reading University until 1937. Early in World War II Bayes submitted works to the War Artists' Advisory Committee for purchase but was refused. In May 1942, however WAAC offered Bayes a short commission to produce a large oil painting on the subject of the air raids that had resulted in damage to parts of Buckingham Palace in 1940 and 1941. The resulting painting, Battle of Britain: Parachutists from an enemy aircraft brought down in an apparent attempt to bomb Buckingham Palace, led to further war-time commissions. During the war Bayes was a prolific contributor to the Recording Britain scheme, producing numerous views of interior locations that often focused on leisure activities and people eating and drinking. He produced 29 watercolours of London for the project, 23 of Essex and 20 of other areas, including seven drawings of Oxford. In 1944 Bayes became Director of Painting at Lancaster School of Arts and Crafts, finally retiring in 1949, aged eighty.

== Published works ==
- 1927: The Art of Decorative Painting,
- 1931: Turner: a Speculative Portrait
- 1932: A Painter's Baggage
