= Maxwell Gordon Lightfoot =

English painter (1886–1911)

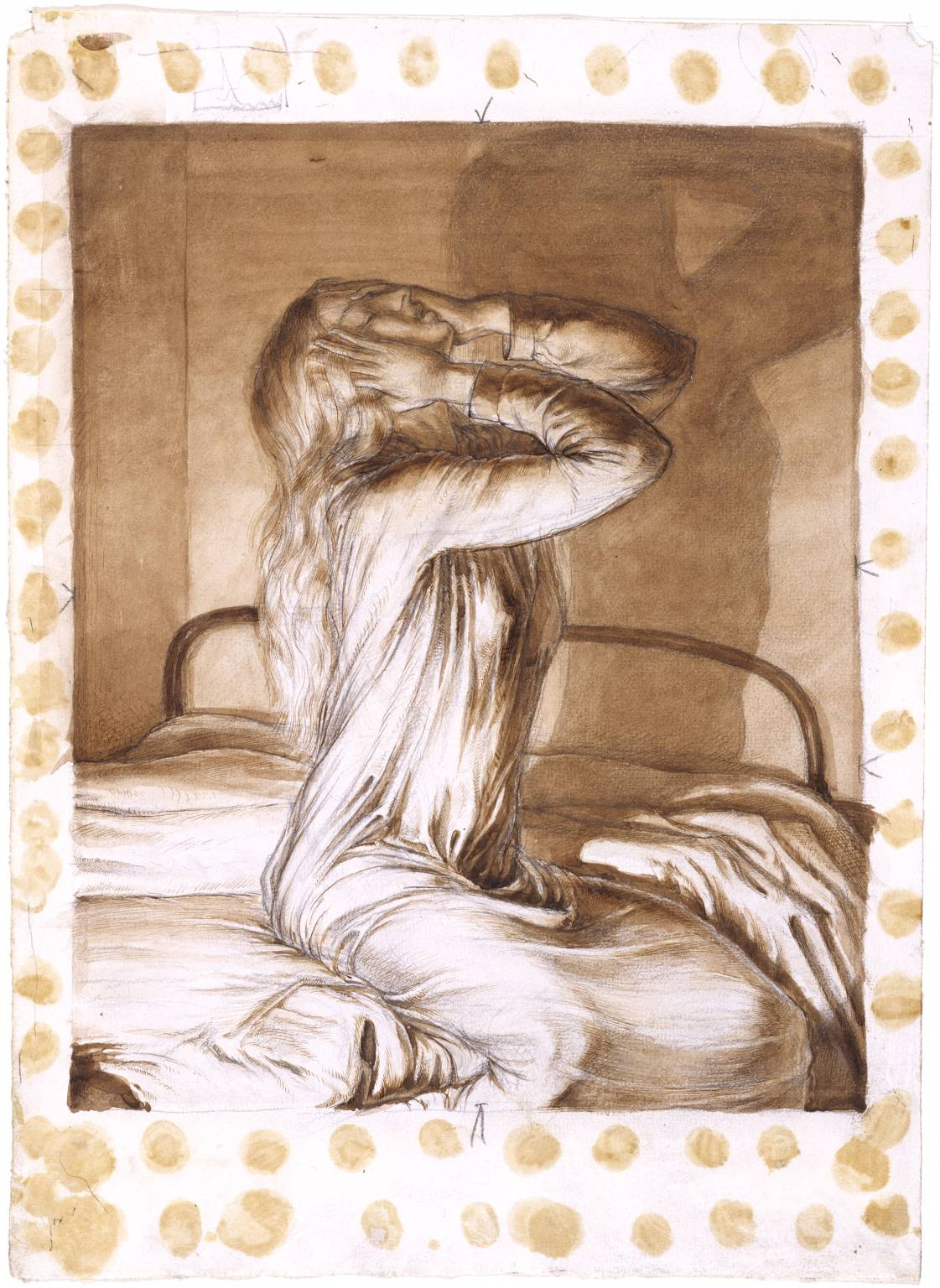
- Study of a Girl (c. 1910); Medium Graphite and watercolour on paper
- Born: 19 July 1886; Liverpool, England
- Died: 27 September 1911 (aged 25); London, England
- Education: Slade School of Art
- Known for: Painting, drawing

Maxwell Gordon Lightfoot (19 July 1886 – 27 September 1911) was an artist and painter from Liverpool who became known for his depictions of atmospheric pastoral scenes and sepia illustrations of figures. Lightfoot showed great talent as a student whilst at the Slade School of Art and when he exhibited with the Camden Town Group, but he killed himself at a young age. His obituary in The Times stated, 'All artists and critics.... were united in believing that Lightfoot would have a most distinguished career in the highest rank of painting.'

== Early life ==
Lightfoot was born in Granby Street, Liverpool, the second of five children to William Henry Lightfoot and his wife, Maxwell Gordon Lindsey. Lindsey had been given a male name as a mark of respect to her father who was lost at sea shortly before her birth. William Lightfoot was an insurance agent, a commercial traveller and eventually a pawnbroker. The family moved to Helsby in Cheshire, where Lightfoot entered the Chester Art School in 1901. The family moved back to Liverpool in 1905 and Lightfoot began attending evening classes at the Sandon Terrace Studios, then run by Gerald Chowne. He became an apprentice chromolithographer with a firm of commercial printers, Tunner and Dunnett, who specialised in printing seed catalogues. Lightfoot continued to paint and had a work shown at the Liverpool Autumn Exhibition of 1907.

== Education and recognition ==
Also in 1907, Lightfoot moved to London to begin studying at the Slade School of Fine Art. Although Lightfoot's contemporaries there included C.R.W Nevinson, Mark Gertler, Edward Wadsworth and Stanley Spencer, he won several prizes, including first prize in both figure and head painting, painting from the cast, the Summer Composition Competition and a second prize in figure drawing. By the time Lightfoot left the Slade in December 1909 he was painting pastoral landscapes and figures compositions often using brown ink. He produced a number of sensitive and well observed mother and child portraits. Lightfoot exhibited at the 1909 Liverpool Autumn Exhibition and had three landscapes shown at the New English Art Club Winter Exhibition the same year. In February 1911, Lightfoot, along with other former Slade students held an exhibition with Vanessa Bell at the Alpine Club Gallery in London. The Times' review singled out Lightfoot and Gertler for particular praise. Lightfoot's work so impressed Spencer Gore that he proposed Lightfoot as one of the original sixteen members of the Camden Town Group. Lightfoot was accepted and showed four works at the first Camden Town Group exhibition held at the Carfax Gallery in June 1911. Two of his figure paintings, Mother and Child and Boy with a Hoop, Frank, stood out as totally different from anything in the show and Lightfoot resigned from the Group as soon as the exhibition closed.

== Death ==
In 1911 Lightfoot became engaged to a woman he had met the previous year. In September 1911, shortly before Lightfoot was due to visit Liverpool to introduce his new fiancée to his relatives he killed himself at his home at 13 Fitzroy Road, Primrose Hill. According to Adrian Allinson, Lightfoot's fiancée, an artist's model, was 'notoriously promiscuous' but his love for her had blinded him to what was 'common knowledge to us all' and the discovery of this 'drove him to the extreme of suicide'. An inquest returned a verdict of 'suicide whilst of unsound mind'. Although an exhibition of his work had been planned for the Carfax Gallery, no paintings were found in his studio and it is thought Lightfoot must have destroyed them.

He left an estate valued for probate at £133, and did not leave a will.
