= Piccadilly Circus (painting) =

Painting by Charles Ginner

- Artist: Charles Ginner
- Year: 1912
- Type: Oil on canvas, genre painting
- Dimensions: 81.3 cm × 66 cm (32.0 in × 26 in)
- Location: Tate Britain, London

Piccadilly Circus is a 1912 oil painting by the French-born British artist Charles Ginner. It shows a view of Piccadilly Circus as traffic passes a flower seller. Significantly it leaves out the famous Eros statue and avoids the Cubist style. Ginner was a member of the Camden Town Group of Post-Impressionist artists, joining the group after relocating from France to England in 1910. He continued to paint similar themes for the remainder of his career. One of the buses features an advertisement for Alhambra Theatre of Varieties, which frequently appeared in works by the Group particularly by Spencer Gore. Today the painting is in the collection of the Tate Britain, which acquired it in 1980.

== Bibliography ==
- Compton, Susan P. British Art in the 20th Century: The Modern Movement. Prestel, 1986.
- Smith, Teddy (ed.) In Visible Touch: Modernism and Masculinity. University of Chicago Press, 1997.
