= Flask Walk, Hampstead, on Coronation Day =

Painting by Charles Ginner

- Artist: Charles Ginner
- Year: 1937
- Type: Oil on canvas, genre painting
- Dimensions: 61 cm × 50.8 cm (24 in × 20.0 in)
- Location: Tate Britain, London

Flask Walk, Hampstead, on Coronation Day is a 1937 oil painting by the French-born British artist Charles Ginner. It depicts Flask Walk in the London suburb of Hampstead, hung with bunting to celebrate the Coronation of George VI on 12 May 1937. The view is taken from the window of Ginner's own house at 61 Hampstead High Street. sign for Hampstead tube station can be seen in the bottom left.

Before the First World War Ginner had been part of the Camden Town Group of artists. The picture was acquired by the Tate following its exhibition at the Redfern Gallery in 1941.

== Bibliography ==
- Ackroyd, Peter. Colours of London: A History. Frances Lincoln, 2022.
- Jenkins, Alan. The Thirties. Stein and Day, 1976.
