= Rule Britannia (painting) =

Painting by Spencer Gore

- Artist: Spencer Gore
- Year: 1910
- Type: Oil on canvas, genre painting
- Dimensions: 63.5 cm × 76.2 cm (25.0 in × 30.0 in)
- Location: Tate Britain, London

Rule Britannia is a 1910 oil painting by the British artist Spencer Gore. It depicts a scene onstage at the Alhambra Theatre in London's West End during the performance of Our Flag, a patriotic ballet. The Danish dancer Britta Petersen is shown wearing a Union Flag tutu. It was produced at the height of the Anglo-German naval rivalry before the First World War. It was displayed at the 1910 exhibition of the New English Art Club, a prominent rival to the Royal Academy.

Gore was a prominent member of the Camden Town Group of artists whose career was cut short by his death in 1914. He was strongly influenced by the Post-Impressionist style which he used to depict everyday scenes in England. The painting was acquired by the Tate Gallery in Pimlico in 1992.

== Bibliography ==
- Humphreys, Richard. The Tate Britain Companion to British Art. Tate Publishing, 2001.
- Upstone, Robert (ed.) Modern Painters: The Camden Town Group. Harry N. Abrams, 2008.
