= Charles Ginner =

British painter (1878–1952)

Charles Ginner CBE ARA
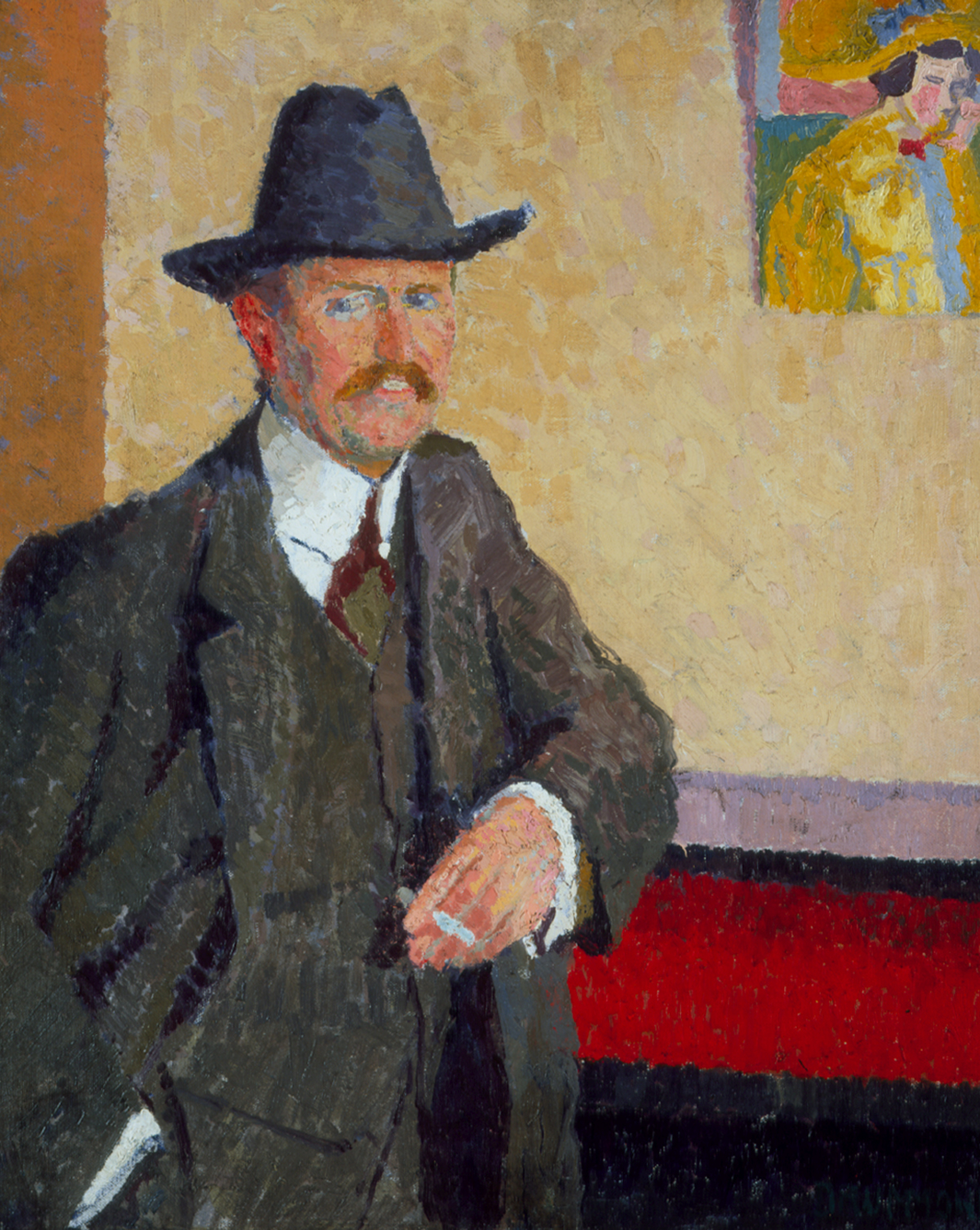
- Portrait of Ginner by Malcolm Drummond, 1911
- Born: 4 March 1878; Cannes, France
- Died: 6 January 1952 (aged 73)
- Known for: Painting

Charles Isaac Ginner CBE ARA (4 March 1878 – 6 January 1952) was a British painter of landscape and urban subjects. Born in the south of France at Cannes, of British parents, in 1910 he settled in London, where he was an associate of Spencer Gore and Harold Gilman and a key member of the Camden Town Group.

== Early years and studies ==
Charles Isaac Ginner was born on 4 March 1878 in Cannes, the second son of Isaac Benjamin Ginner, a British medical doctor. He had a younger sister, Ruby (b. 1886; who became the dance teacher Ruby Dyer). He was educated in Cannes at the Institut Stanislas (Cannes).

At an early age, Ginner formed the intention of becoming a painter, but his parents disapproved. When he was sixteen, he suffered from typhoid and double pneumonia and travelled in a tramp steamer around the south Atlantic and the Mediterranean to convalesce; on returning to Cannes, he worked in an engineer's office, and in 1899, at the age of 21, moved to Paris to study architecture.

In 1904, his parents withdrew their opposition to his becoming a painter, and Ginner entered the Academie Vitti, where Henri Martin was teaching but where Ginner worked mostly under Paul Gervais, who disapproved of Ginner's use of bright colours. In 1905, Ginner moved to the Ecole des Beaux Arts, but in 1906, after Gervais had left, he returned to Vitti's, where his principal teacher was Hermenegildo Anglada Camarasa, who disapproved of Ginner's admiration for Vincent van Gogh.

== Painting career ==
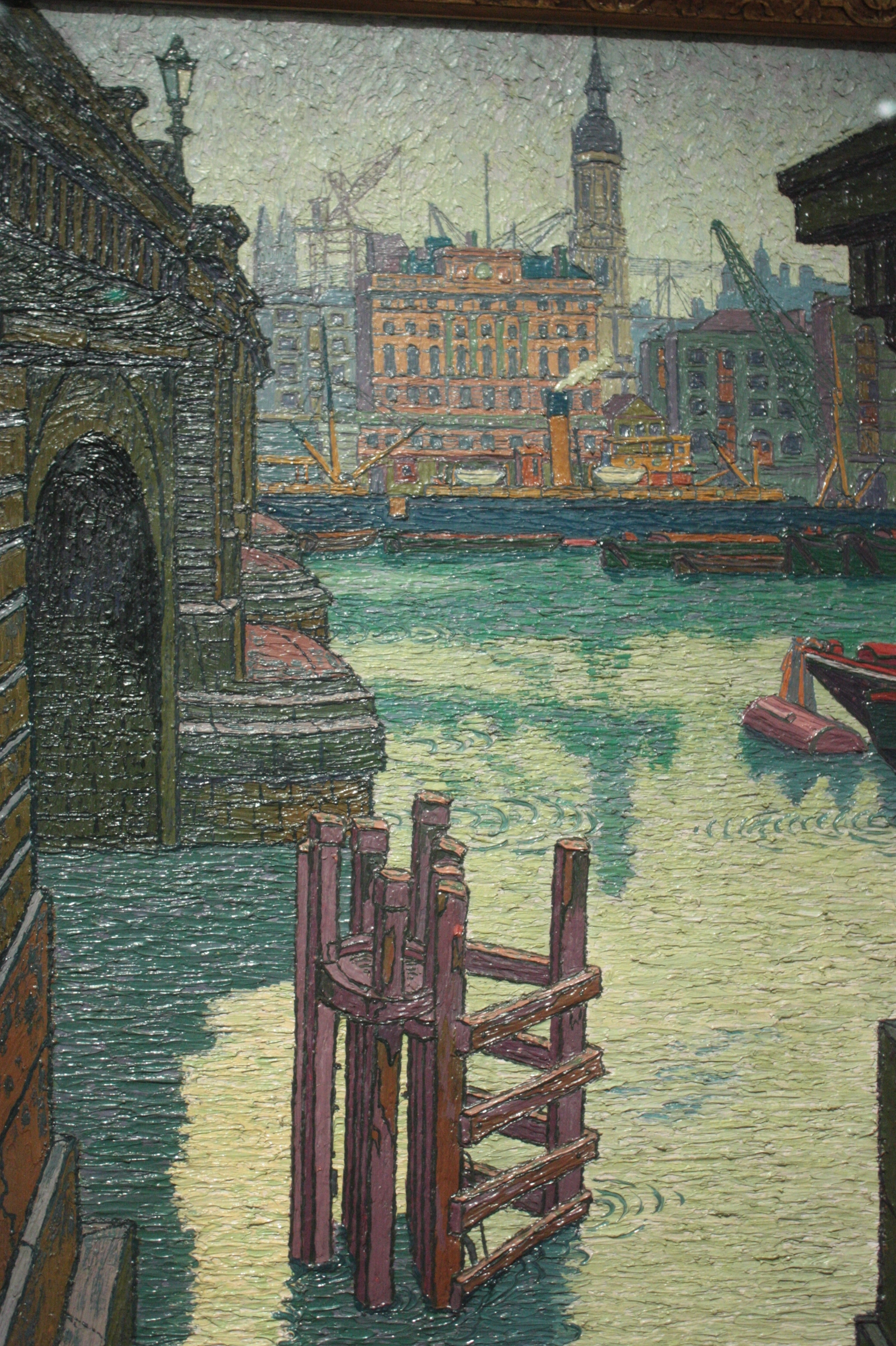
London Bridge, 1913

In 1908, Ginner left Vitti's and worked on his own in Paris, taking Vincent van Gogh, Paul Gauguin, and Paul Cézanne for his guides.

In 1909, Ginner visited Buenos Aires, Argentina, where he held his first one-person show, which helped to introduce post-Impressionism to South America. His oil paintings showed the influence of Van Gogh, with their heavy impasto paint.

In 1910, Ginner went to London, to serve on the Hanging Committee of the Allied Artists Association's third exhibition. Harold Gilman and Spencer Gore became his friends and persuaded him to settle in London. He lived at first in Battersea, but afterwards in Camden Town, where he was a neighbour of Gilman and Gore and regularly attended the Saturday afternoons at 19 Fitzroy Street, meeting Robert Bevan, John Nash, Albert Rothenstein, C. R. W. Nevinson, Jacob Epstein, Walter Bayes, Walter Sickert, and Lucien Pissarro. In 1911, he became a member of the Camden Town Group; in 1913 of the London Group; in 1914 of the Cumberland Market Group. In 1914 in the New Age he spelt out the artistic creed known as New Realism. In the same year he showed jointly with Gilman at the Goupil Gallery.

During World War I, in about 1916, Ginner was called up, serving firstly in the Royal Army Ordnance Corps, secondly in the Intelligence Corps, and lastly for the Canadian War Records, for which he made a painting of a powder-filling factory in Hereford.

In 1919, on Gilman's death, he published an appreciation of the artist in Art and Letters. In 1920 he became a member of the New English Art Club.

During World War II he was again an Official War Artist, and specialised in painting harbour scenes and bombed buildings in London. In 1942 he became an Associate of the Royal Academy, where he advocated the admission of younger artists.

In 1950, he was awarded a CBE.

Ginner painted buildings in an urban context, as in his painting Plymouth Pier from The Hoe. His watercolours are unmistakable, with meticulous detailing of trees and buildings.

The Tate Gallery in London and many other galleries hold his work. The National Portrait Gallery, London, has a typically precise self-portrait.

He died in London on 6 January 1952. The Arts Council of Great Britain held a touring memorial in 1953-4.

== Gallery ==
The Café Royal, 1911

Piccadilly Circus, 1912

Clayhidon, 1913

Flask Walk, Hampstead, on Coronation Day, 1937

== Bibliography ==
- Helena Bonett, 'Charles Ginner 1878–1952', artist biography, January 2011, in Helena Bonett, Ysanne Holt, Jennifer Mundy (eds.), The Camden Town Group in Context, Tate, May 2012, http://www.tate.org.uk/art/research-publications/camden-town-group/charles-ginner-r1105346
- Robert Upstone, Modern Painters: The Camden Town Group, exhibition catalogue, Tate Britain, London, 2008 ISBN 1-85437-781-7
- J. Rothenstein, 'Charles Ginner 1878–1952', in J. Rothenstein, Modern English Painters Sickert To Smith (1952), p. 188–193.
