= Gilbert Bayes =

British artist

Gilbert William Bayes
- Born: 4 April 1872; London, England
- Died: 10 July 1953 (aged 81); Marylebone, London
- Education: City and Guilds of London Art School; Royal Academy Schools
- Known for: Sculpture

Gilbert William Bayes (4 April 1872 – 10 July 1953) was an English sculptor. His art works varied in scale from medals to large architectural clocks, monuments and equestrian statues and he was also a designer of some note, creating chess pieces, mirrors and cabinets.

== Career ==
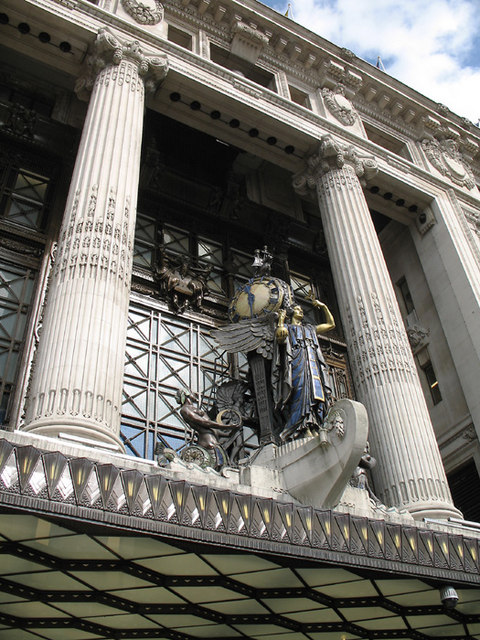
The Queen of Time, Selfridges, London, 1928

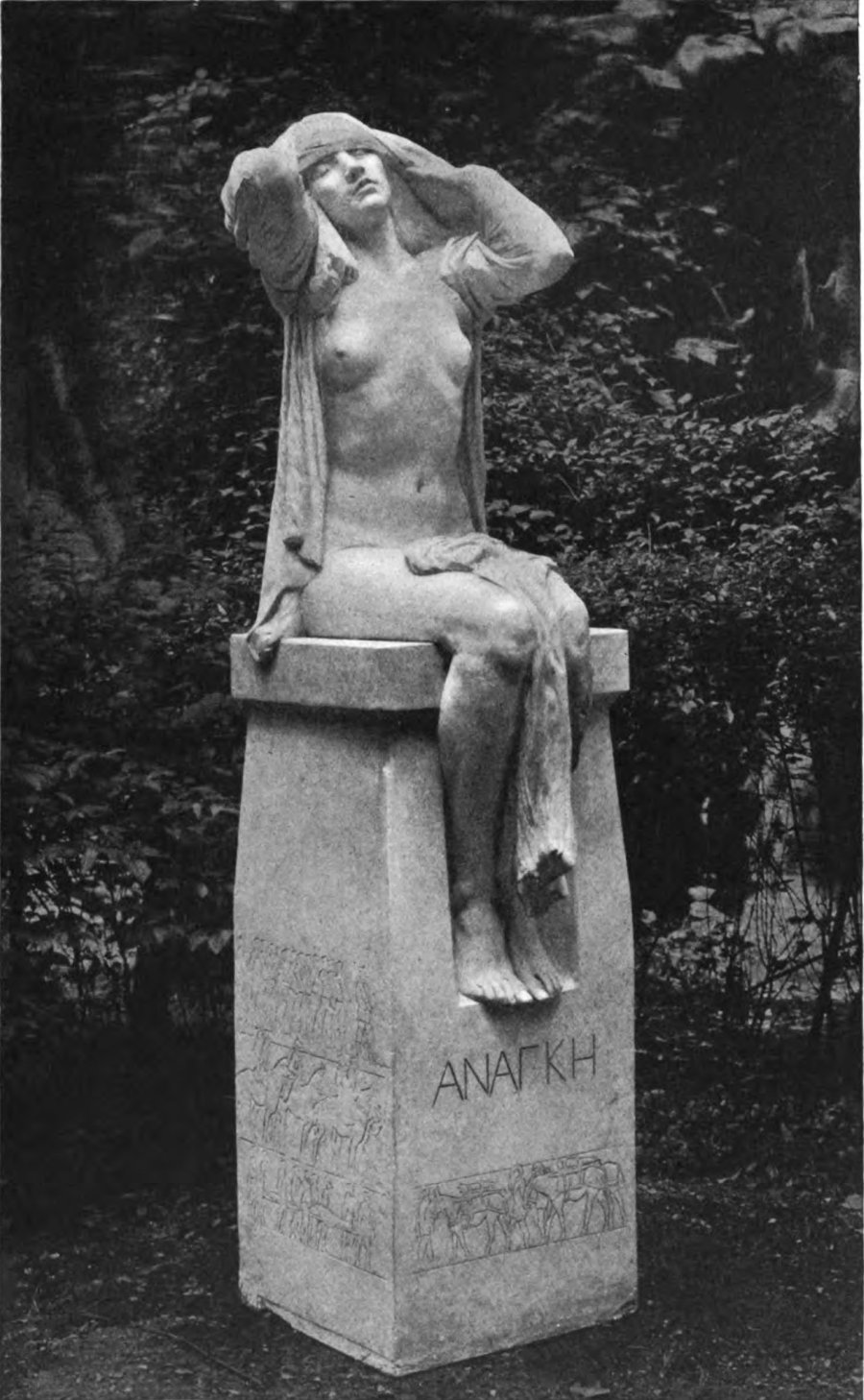
Destiny, war memorial, Albion Gardens, Ramsgate, Kent, 1920

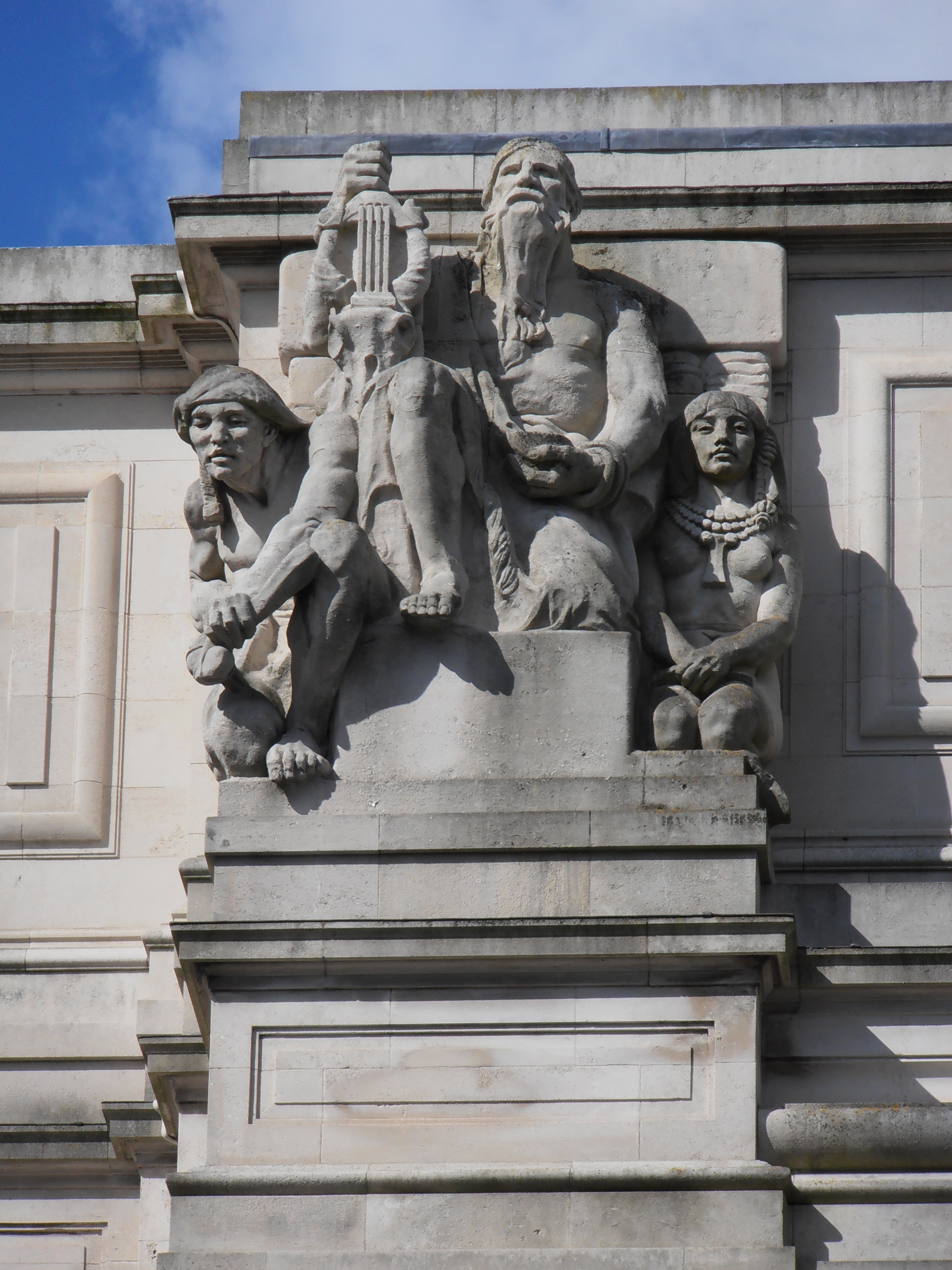
Prehistoric Period

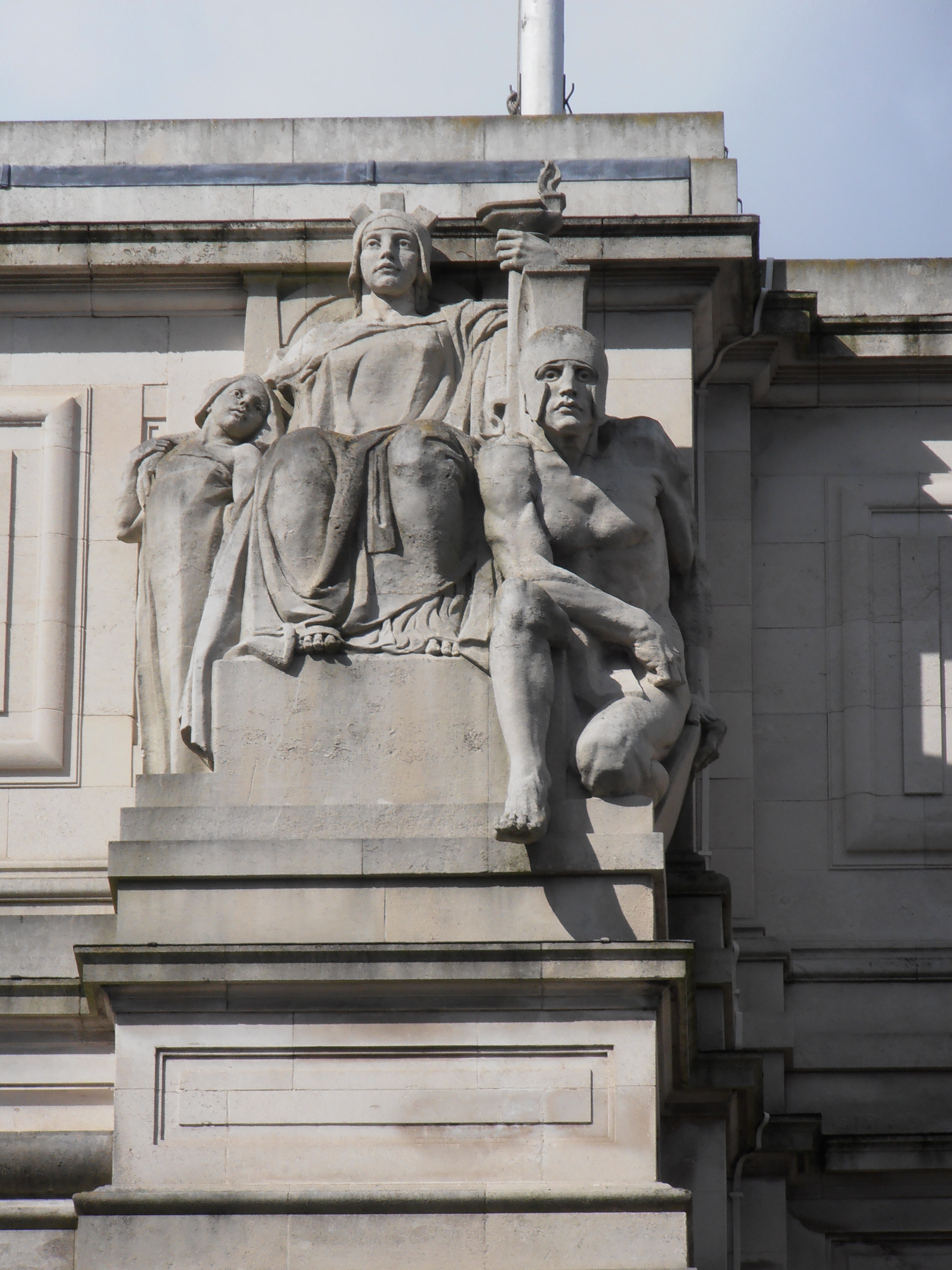
Classic period

National Museum Cardiff, 1914–1915

Bayes was born in London into a family of artists, his father being Alfred Walter Bayes, an established artist at the time. He was one of four children and brother to both the well-known artist and critic Walter Bayes, and to the Arts & Crafts designer Jessie Bayes. Gilbert Bayes studied at the City and Guilds of London Art School and then at the Royal Academy Schools between 1896 and 1899, where he won a gold medal and a travelling scholarship to Paris. Bayes' lengthy and illustrious career began as a student under Sir George Frampton and Harry Bates, and so became associated with the British New Sculpture movement and its focus on architectural sculpture. He first exhibited at the Royal Academy in London in 1889, aged 17. In Paris, Bayes won an honourable mention at the 1900 International Exhibition, then several medals at the Paris Salon and, in 1925, a gold medal and diploma of honour at the Exhibition of Decorative Art. His work was part of the sculpture event in the art competition at the 1928 Summer Olympics.

Bayes is perhaps best remembered for his interest in colour, his association with the Royal Doulton Company, and his work in polychrome ceramics and enamelled bronze. His 1939 major polychrome stonework frieze, Pottery through the Ages at the Doulton Headquarters in London was removed in the 1960s when the building was razed, and the 50-foot-long (15 m) work was re-located to the Victoria and Albert Museum. He also designed a number of war memorials, with public works throughout the former British Empire, from New South Wales to Bangalore.

In 1896, Bayes was elected to the Art Workers' Guild, and in 1925 was elected to the position of Master. Bayes served as president of the Royal British Society of Sculptors, PRBS, from 1939 through 1944, and of the Ealing Art Group from 1947 to 1953. He died in London in 1953. Bayes' home at 4 Greville Place in St. John's Wood bears a blue plaque erected by English Heritage in 2007.

== Personal life ==
In 1906, Bayes married Gertrude Smith, a fellow sculptor, in Farnham, Surrey. They had two children:

- Eleanor Jean Gilbert Bayes (1908–1999), also an artist
- Geoffrey Gilbert Bayes (1912–2001)

== Works ==
- Statues of Sir William Chambers and Sir Charles Barry and other exterior work at the Victoria and Albert Museum under Sir Aston Webb, London, circa 1909.
- Prehistoric Period and Classic Period, architectural sculpture at the National Museum Cardiff, 1914–1915
- Destiny, Albion Gardens, Ramsgate, Kent, dedicated 1920
- Hythe war memorial, Kent, 1921
- Todmorden War Memorial, West Yorkshire, 1921.
- The Offerings of Peace and The Offerings of War at the Art Gallery of New South Wales, 1923
- The National War Memorial, St. John's, Newfoundland and Labrador, 1924. The bronze figures for the memorial were cast by Ercole James Parlanti of London.
- The Building of King Solomon's Temple, Central Warwickshire Masonic Temple (demolished), Birmingham, 1927 (frieze said to be in store)
- The Queen of Time monumental bronze and enamel group with clock above central Oxford Street entrance to Selfridges department store, London, 1928
- Drama Through the Ages, polychrome ceramic frieze for the Saville Theatre (now the Odeon Covent Garden cinema), Shaftesbury Avenue, London, 1931
- The Segrave Trophy, 1932
- About 200 sculpted figures executed in coloured and glazed Doultonware set on washing line posts and finials in the housing estates of the St Pancras Home Improvement Society (now Origin Housing Group), Somers Town, London, and at York Rise Estate, Camden, 1920s and 1930s. In 1980 the figures were almost all intact and in good repair; since then, large numbers of figures have been destroyed, removed or stolen.
- Exterior bas-reliefs and interior work at the BBC Broadcasting House, London, 1931
- Six allegorical relief panels, Commercial Bank of Scotland, Bothwell Street, Glasgow, 1934–35
- A series of sporting figures outside Lord's Cricket Ground, London, 1934
- Pottery through the Ages, polychrome ceramic frieze for the London headquarters of the Royal Doulton Company, Lambeth, 1939. Building demolished, but frieze displayed in the Victoria and Albert Museum.
- Two memorial bronzes at the St James' Church, Warter
- Statue of Jamsetji Tata at the Indian Institute of Science, Bangalore
- Blue Robed Bambino fountain at the Centre William Rappard, Geneva (also known as Child with Fish)
- Reliefs featuring musicians on No.8 Cavendish Square, London. The building had been the showroom of Brinmeads, an English piano manufacturer.

== Legacy ==
The Victoria and Albert Museum in South Kensington has named a gallery after Bayes. In 2011 the Royal British Society of Sculptors created the Gilbert Bayes Award for early career sculptors.
