= Jessie Bayes =

British artist (1876–1970)

- Born: 1876; London, United Kingdom
- Died: 1970 (aged 93–94); London, United Kingdom
- Known for: Painting, Illumination, Murals
- Movement: Arts and Crafts

Jessie Bayes (b. 1876 Hampstead, London - d. 1970) was a British Arts & Crafts artist who specialized in miniature paintings, illuminated manuscripts, stained glass, iconography and more.

== Biography ==
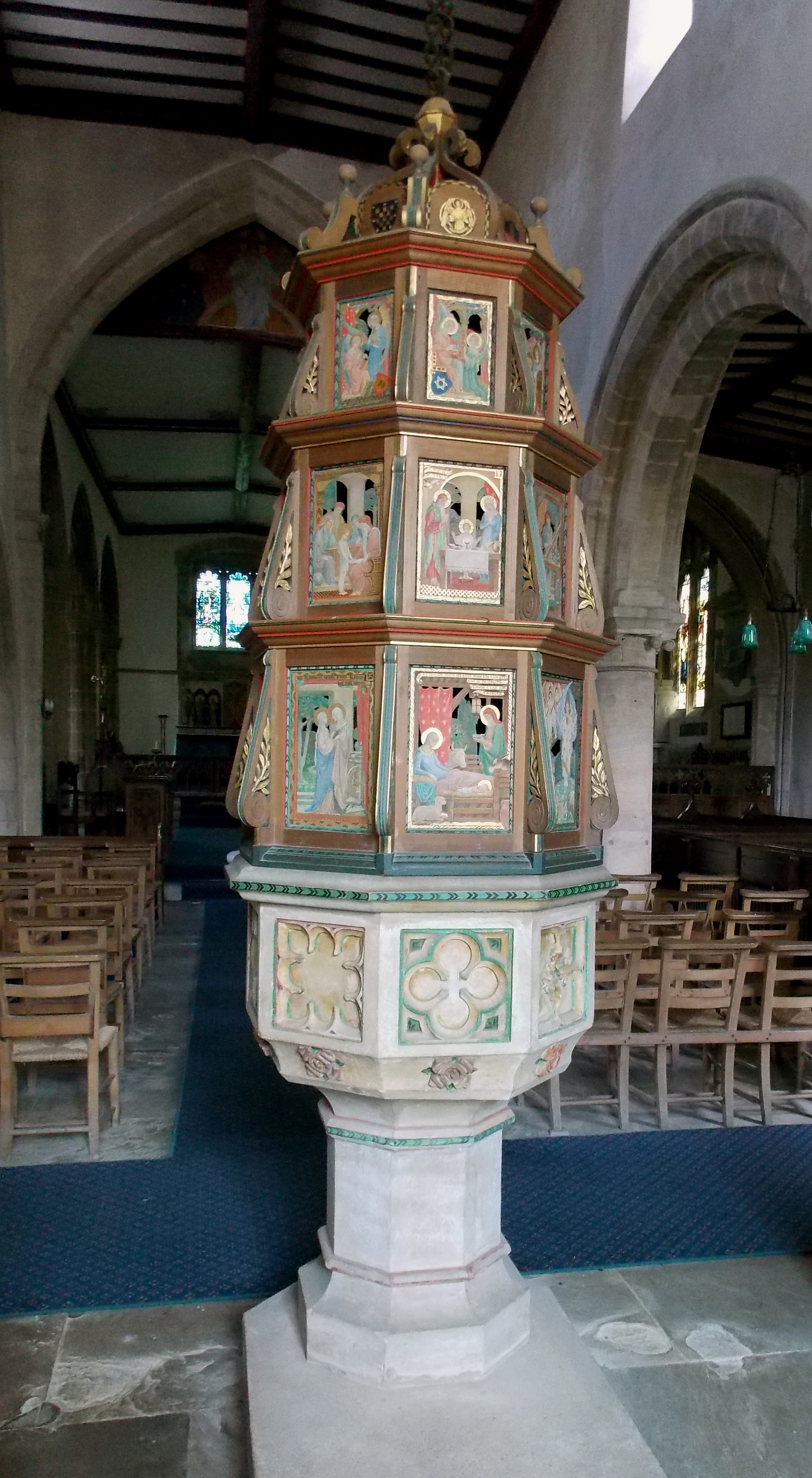
Font panels for St Andrew and St Mary's Church, Stoke Rochford, 1937 by Bayes.

In the earlier part of her life, Bayes did not have much technical training in the arts, but was born into a family of artists. She studied under her brother Walter Bayes, who was a well known artist and critic at the time. She was sister to Gilbert Bayes and Emmeline Bayes as well. Her father Alfred Walter Bayes, was an artist who regularly exhibited at the Royal Academy of Arts.

In 1906 she became a member of the Royal Society of Miniature Painters, Sculptors and Gravers and in 1908 exhibited at the Royal Academy. She was a part of RMS's council throughout 1925-1935. One example of her work is the stained glass windows for St. Luke's Church in Grayshott, Hampshire, England.

During World War II, she ran a kitchen for convalescing patients and then had a job making engine parts for aircraft. From 1953 onwards, following her brother Gilbert's death, she lived at his home at 4a Greville Park, Hampstead, with her niece Eleanor.

== List of works ==
- The Lady of Shallott - 1914
- To The Night & The Cloud - 1914
- Roll of Honour memorial - 1919 (Flookburgh, Cumbria)
- Memorial mural to Percy and Elsie Rathbone in St Martin of Tours church, Epsom - 1927
- Font cover panels for St Andrew and St Mary's Church, Stoke Rochford (Stoke Rochford, Lincolnshire) - 1937
- Memorial window to Capt. Glyn David Rhys-Williams at the Church of St. David at Miskin.
- St. Luke's Church windows (Grayshott, Hampshire) - 1962
