= The West Pier, Brighton =

Painting by Spencer Gore

- Artist: Spencer Gore
- Year: 1913
- Type: Oil on canvas, landscape painting
- Dimensions: 63.5 cm × 76.2 cm (25.0 in × 30.0 in)
- Location: Brighton Museum and Art Gallery, Sussex

The West Pier, Brighton is a 1913 landscape painting by the British artist Spencer Gore. It depicts a view of the West Pier on the seafront of Brighton in Sussex. Gore was a leading member of the Camden Town Group of Post-Impressionist artists. He produced the picture while staying with his friend Walton Taylor and the view is from Taylor's balcony in Brunswick Square. The painting is now in the collection of the Brighton Museum and Art Gallery having been acquired in 2019 with the assistance of the Art Fund.

== Bibliography ==
- Baron, Wendy. Perfect Moderns: A History of the Camden Town Group. Ashgate, 2000.
- Harris, Alexandra & Feigel, Lara. Modernism on Sea: Art and Culture at the British Seaside. Peter Lang, 2009.
- Postle, Martin (ed.) Art of the Garden. Harry N. Abrams, 2004.
