= John Doman Turner =

English painter

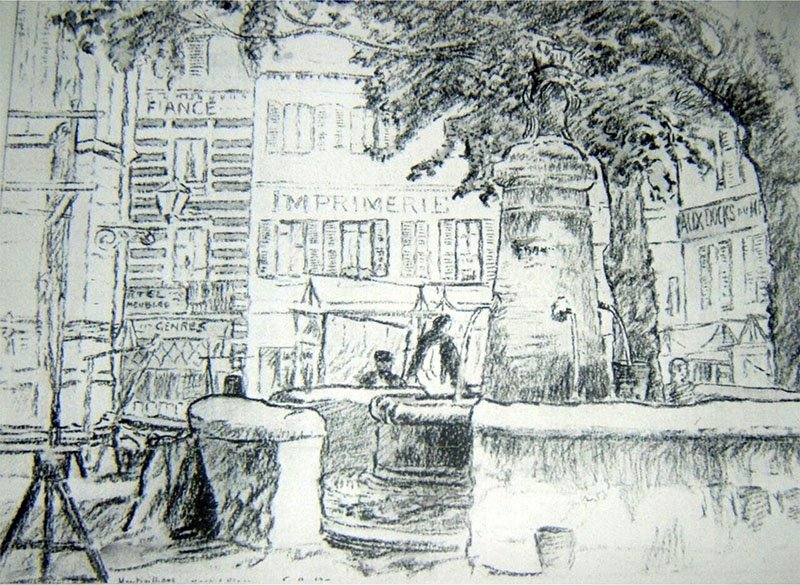
Montivilliers was one of the first works to be discovered after John Doman Turner's death featured in the Wendy Baron book Camden Town Group (1979)

John Doman Turner (25 October 1871 – 3 January 1938) was a deaf British painter and member of the Camden Town Group.

Born in Brixton in London, Turner received artistic training by correspondence from Spencer Gore while working as a stockbroker's clerk. This correspondence still exists, and has been used by subsequent artists, for example Esther Freud in her novel The Sea House.

Turner exhibited twelve works with the Camden Town Group in three exhibitions between 1911 and 1912 (see 'Works' below).

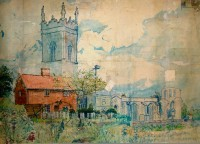
A section of the Walberswick Scroll - a 123-ft watercolour study of every house in the village, painted in 1931/32 by John Doman Turner.

During his later life Turner went on to paint four unique scrolls including the Walberswick Scroll, a 123-foot 'Dioramic Pictorial Record of a Suffolk Village' which detailed every dwelling of the Suffolk village of Walberswick. This was followed by the Trinity Fair Scroll, a portrait of a travelling circus, which can be seen at the Swan Hotel, Southwold.

The Walberswick Scroll has made several appearances on TV, the first on ITV News in May 2017, the second on More 4's 'Penelope Keith's Coastal Villages' in January 2018.

He died from pneumonia at his Streatham home on 3 January 1938.

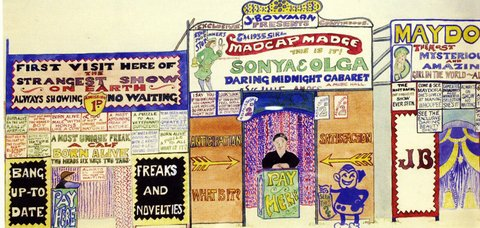
A section of the Trinity Fair Scroll - from Southwold, which can be seen at the Swan Hotel, Southwold

A major exhibition of his work was displayed in the University of Hull, and at the Michael Parkin Gallery in 1997.

During the early 1990s Southampton Art Gallery acquired an example of the work of John Doman Turner titled The Joy Wheel Mitcham. Every year the fun fair arrived on Mitcham Common and just a few years before the outbreak of the 1914–18 war JDT went and painted the watercolour.

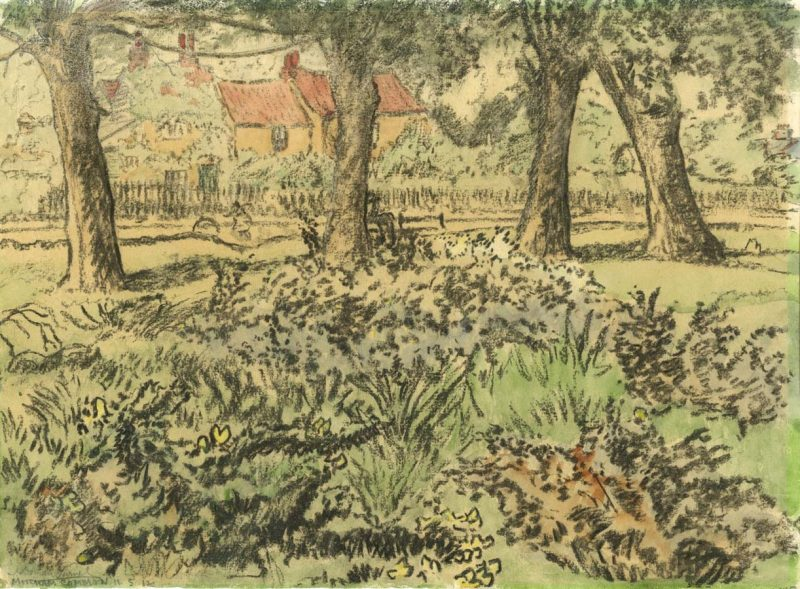
Newly discovered John Doman Turner work by father and son duo at johndomanturner.com, believed to be featured in the Third Exhibition of the Camden Town Group in December 1912.

He also painted other works of Mitcham around the same time which come from the same collection.

== Works ==
John Doman Turner's works include the following, as featured at the Camden Town Group exhibitions:

- Duncan and Godfrey in ‘The Coster’s Courtship’
- Elizabeth II at Brighton
- In the Grand Circle
- Brighton Shelters
- Walberswick
- HMS - Sheerness
- St. Valery-S-Somme
- The Sound of Kerrera and Kerrera Island, Oban
- Eastbourne
- Canal Boats
- The Fair Green, Mitcham
- Mitcham Common

In the 1930s John Doman Turner painted four huge scrolls in watercolour:

- Ferry Road Scroll
- Walberswick Scroll
- Trinity Fair Scroll
- Fairground Frieze
