= Todmorden War Memorial =

War Memorial in Todmorden, West Yorkshire, England

- Todmorden
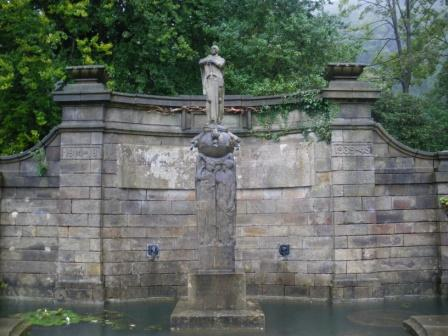
- Todmorden War Memorial
- For the men of Todmorden who died in World War I, World War II and the Korean War
- Unveiled: 9 October 1921
- Location: 53.71821°N 2.10753°W near Todmorden
- Designed by: Gilbert Bayes
- These are they who being peacable citizens of Todmorden at the call of King and country and in defence of their natie land left all that was dear to them, endured hardship, faced danger and finally passed out of the sight of man by the path of duty and self sacrifice, giving up their own lives that others might live in freedom. Their name liveth on for evermore.

Todmorden War Memorial is a war memorial located in Todmorden, West Yorkshire, England.

The memorial is in the garden of remembrance in Centre Vale Park with sculptural work by Gilbert Bayes. (Note: The parents of Gilbert Bayes were Todmorden people. His father, Alfred Walter Bayes, was a school master at Lumbutts and had married Emily Ann Fielden of Todmorden. He was a distinguished artist and taught at one time at Lumbutts School. They had four children- Gilbert William, Walter John, Emmeline and Jessie Bayes. Both Walter John and Jessie enjoyed success in the world of art.) The War Memorial was unveiled on 9 October 1921accompanied by a garden of flowers.

== The monument ==
The memorial comprises an ornamental fountain with basin in which stands a carved relief pillar depicting draped female figures with wreath and palm. The pillar is surmounted by a St George standing on an orb. The orb features four dragon head water spouts. The fountain is placed in front of a long wall with tablets bearing the names of the fallen. The fountain and wall are set within a formal garden in which also stood two freestanding statues of "The Lamp of Memory" and "The Shield of Honour". The original statues were stolen in 1996, however, in summer 2011 Todmorden Civic Society under the direction of Paul Clarke, a former Gunner, embarked on a campaign to raise funds and have the statues replaced in time for centenary of the commencement of the First World War. After over three years of fundraising and successfully applying for grants towards the project, the two replica statues, carved by Nick Roberson, member of The Master Carvers Association were unveiled at a Rededication Service held at the Garden of Remembrance after a Military Parade by the Todmorden branch of the Royal British Legion on Sunday 12 October.

The project led to further works being carried out to the War Memorial with a grant from the Yorkshire Garden Trust and funding from Calderdale Council. The works included re-laying of paths, together with new stone edgings, indent repairs to the name tablets, re-pointing of the memorial wall, cleaning of the St George statue and repairs to the stone steps at the rear of the garden. Much of this work was carried out by Bullen Conservation and Nick Roberson.

== Inscriptions ==
The piece stands on a plinth in a horse-shoe shaped water basin with a tall wall behind bearing the dates “1914–18” and “1939–1945”. Between these two dates is set the main inscription, the text of which is given below and on either side and in six bays are tablets engraved with the names of the fallen. Apart from remembering the 659 men from Todmorden who died in World War I, the memorial also remembers the 150 men of Todmorden who died in World War II and two men killed in the Korean War. The names are arranged alphabetically, without distinction as to rank, under their respective regiments.

The sculptures were completed in 1921 and the main inscription reads:

THESE ARE THEY WHO BEING PEACEABLE CITIZENS OF TODMORDEN AT THE CALL OF KING AND COUNTRY AND IN DEFENCE OF THEIR NATIVE LAND LEFT ALL THAT WAS DEAR TO THEM, ENDURED HARDSHIP, FACED DANGER AND FINALLY PASSED OUT OF THE SIGHT OF MAN BY THE PATH OF DUTY AND SELF SACRIFICE, GIVING UP THEIR OWN LIVES THAT OTHERS MIGHT LIVE IN FREEDOM. THEIR NAME LIVETH ON FOR EVERMORE
