= Fitzroy Street Group =

The Fitzroy Street Group was an organisation created to promote and support artists. It was established in 1907 by Walter Sickert and merged in 1913 with the Camden Town Group to form the London Group.

== Overview ==
In 1907 Walter Sickert formed the Fitzroy Street Group. Initial members were Walter Russell, Spencer Gore, and brother Albert Rutherston and William Rothenstein. Robert Bevan, Lucien Pissarro, Nan Hudson and Ethel Sands also joined the organization.

The Fitzroy Street Group and the male member only Camden Town Group, a male-member organization, merged in 1913 to become the London Group.
