= James Bolivar Manson =

English painter

James Bolivar Manson as Tate Director

James Bolivar Manson (26 June 1879 in London – 3 July 1945 in London) was an artist and worked at the Tate gallery for 25 years, including serving as its director from 1930 to 1938. In the Tate's own evaluation he was the "least successful" of their directors. His time there was frustrated by his stymied ambition as a painter and he declined into alcoholism, culminating in a drunken outburst at an official dinner in Paris. Although his art policies were more advanced than previously at the Tate and embraced Impressionism, he stopped short of accepting newer artistic movements like Surrealism and German Expressionism, thus earning the scorn of critics such as Douglas Cooper. He retired on the grounds of ill health and resumed his career as a flower painter until his death.

== Early life ==
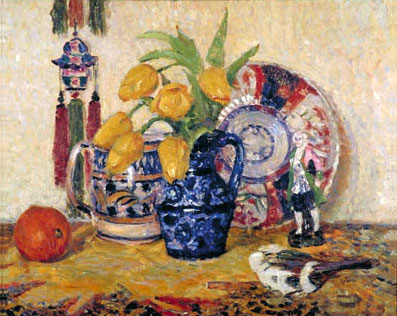
Still Life: Tulips in a Blue Jug by J.B. Manson, c. 1912

James Bolivar Manson was born at 65 Appach Road, Brixton, London, to Margaret Emily (née Deering) and James Alexander Manson, who was the first literary editor of the Daily Chronicle, an editor for Cassell & Co Ltd and of the Makers of British Art series for Walter Scott Publishing Co. Manson's middle name was after Simón Bolívar. His grandfather was also named James Bolivar Manson. He had an older sister, Margaret Esther Manson, a younger sister, Rhoda Mary Manson, and three younger brothers, Charles Deering Manson, Robert Graham Manson (a musician and composer) and Magnus Murray Manson.

At the age of 16, he left Alleyn's School, Dulwich, and, in the face of his father's opposition to painting as a career, became an office boy with the publisher George Newnes, and then a bank clerk, a job he loathed and lightened with bird imitations and practical jokes. In the meantime he determinedly studied painting at Heatherley School of Fine Art from 1890 and then Lambeth School of Art, and was encouraged by Lilian Beatrice Laugher, a violinist who had studied with Joachim in Berlin and was staying in the household, which by that time was at 7 Ardbeg Road, Herne Hill, London.

== Marriage ==
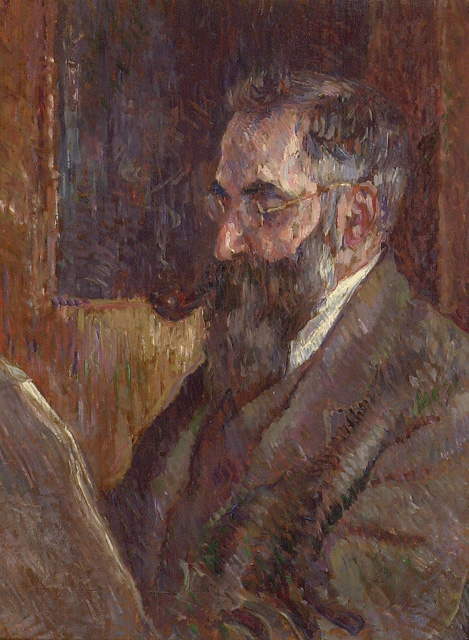
Lucien Pissarro Reading, by J.B. Manson, c. 1913

In 1903, Manson left the bank job, hanging his silk hat on a pole and encouraging his colleagues to aim stones at it. He married Laugher and they moved to the Latin Quarter in Paris, renting a room for £1 a month and economising in a shared studio with Charles Polowetski, Bernard Gussow and Jacob Epstein, who became a lifelong friend and with whom he studied at the Académie Julian, still dominated by the Impressionists' enemy, Adolphe Bouguereau; occasionally Jean-Paul Laurens tutored.

After a year, the Mansons returned to London and their daughter Mary was born, followed two years later by Jean. They lived in the top two floors of 184 Adelaide Road, Hampstead, where his wife gave music lessons at the front and Manson set up a studio at the rear, working out the family's tight budget on the kitchen wall much to her displeasure. In 1908 they moved to a small house at 98 Hampstead Way, where they stayed for 30 years. Lilian succeeded Bernard Shaw's mother as music director at the North London Collegiate School for Girls; in 1910 The Times took notice of her revival of Purcell's Dido and Aeneas, for which Manson designed and helped to make costumes. In 1910 also, he became a member and Secretary of the Camden Town Group.

== Employment at the Tate ==
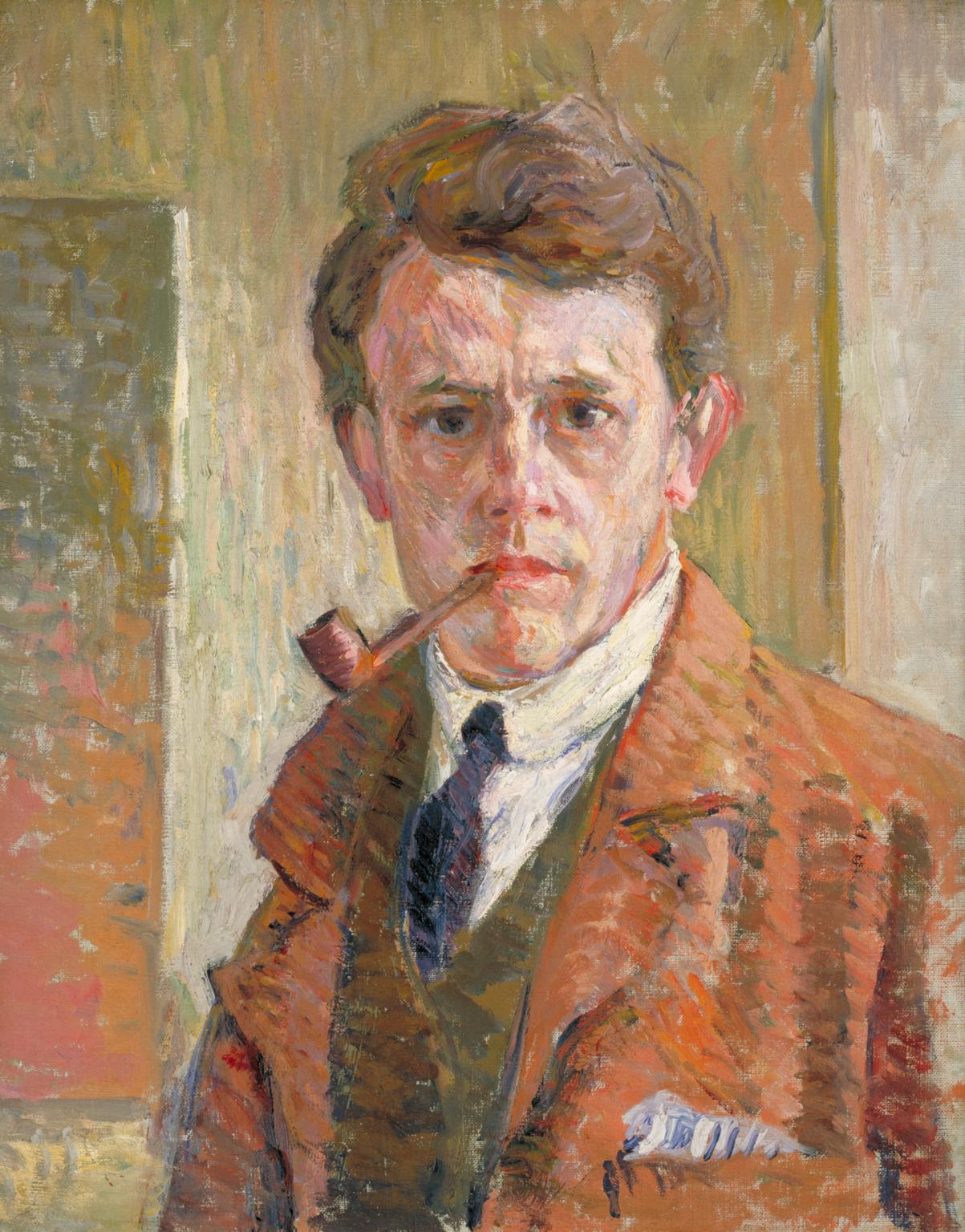
Self-Portrait by J.B. Manson, c. 1912

Lilian was a close friend of Tate director Charles Aitken and, in summer 1911, the Mansons stayed with him at a holiday home in Alfriston, Sussex. Manson had assisted Aitken with hanging a show at the Tate and the Director was sufficiently impressed to suggest Manson took the job of Clerk, vacant since its former occupant had been pilfering the petty cash. Manson achieved by far the best results out of the four applicants taking the appropriate civil service exam, and, age 33, became Tate Clerk on 9 December 1912 with an annual salary of £150. His reluctance to take the job had been overcome by his wife, who wanted provision for their two daughters; he continued to paint intensely at weekends.

With the Keeper, he was jointly responsible for staff supervision, office administration and care of the collection. Manson is considered to have given Aitken a liking for French Impressionism and to have highlighted the Camden Town Group, even though its leader, Walter Sickert, was still outside the official canon. When a Sickert was offered to the Tate in 1915, Manson wrote, "tell the Trustees I think it is a very good Sickert—but the question is whether he is important enough for the Tate. I think not; but as an old friend of the artist perhaps I am a prejudiced judge."

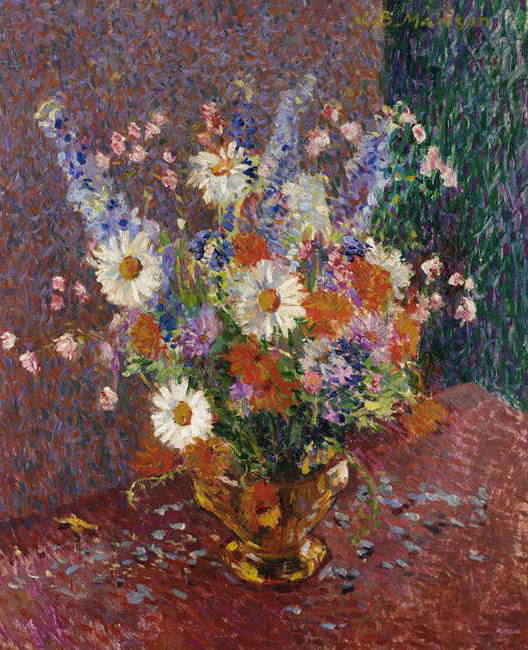
Still Life with Flowers by J.B. Manson, c. 1919

In 1914, he joined the London Group. From 1915, he showed work with the New English Art Club (NEAC). Because his work for the gallery was considered indispensable, he was exempt from military service; in 1917, he was promoted to Assistant Keeper. In 1919, Lucien Pissarro formed the Monarro Group with Manson as the London Secretary and Théo van Rysselberghe as the Paris secretary, aiming to show artists inspired by Impressionist painters, Claude Monet and Camille Pissarro; the group ceased three years later. In 1923, at the Leicester Galleries, Manson held his first solo show of work. In 1927, he became a member of the NEAC. His reputation as an artist was primarily as a flower painter and art was his main ambition, but he was uncertain as to whether this would allow him to earn a full-time living—in 1928 he asked Roger Fry's advice on the matter. However, in 1930, he became Director of the Tate, a post which he held until 1938.

He also wrote art criticism, as well as an introduction to the Tate's collection, Hours in the Tate Gallery (1926) and books on Degas (1927), Rembrandt (1929), John Singer Sargent and Dutch painting.

=== Director of the Tate ===
Manson had a minor accident, which delayed his taking up the post of Director of the Tate by a month, until August 1930. According to the Tate web site, he was "the least successful of Tate's Directors." His own artistic ambitions had not been fulfilled, he had an unhappy marriage and he drank to excess; he suffered from depression, blackouts and paranoia; and he had long periods off work sick. Kenneth Clark described him as having, "a flushed face, white hair and a twinkle in his eye; and this twinkling got him out of scrapes that would have sunk a worthier man without trace."

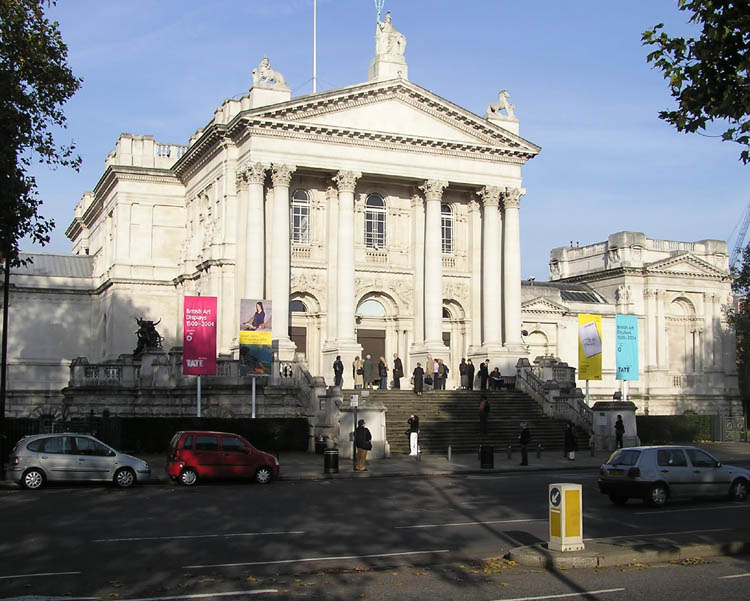
Tate Britain in 2004 (renamed from Tate Gallery in 2000)

During his time as Director, there was no annual funding for acquisitions from the government; he had to decline Camille Pissarro's offer to loan his painting La Causette as the gallery lacked funds for transport and insurance. Manson complained to his friend, Lucien Pissarro about the conservative taste of the trustee board—which had rejected a work by both Monet and Renoir—although he himself was averse to Post Impressionist work, neglecting London shows by artists such as Van Gogh and Matisse, until he had no option but to accept two oils by the latter in 1933 as part of a bequest. The same year, he and the Trustees rejected a donation of four William Coldstream paintings and two Henry Moore sculptures, and, in 1935, declined to buy Matisse's Interior with a Figure for £2000, turned down the loan of Picabia's Courtyard in France and also the offer of a gift of three Roger Fry oils. In 1938, Manson asked Sir Robert Sainsbury if the Tate could borrow a study of Eve by French sculptor Charles Despiau. Sainsbury assented on condition that the gallery also showed the 1932 "Mother and Child of my friend Henry Moore." Manson's response was, "Over my dead body."

Although Frank Rutter, a Sunday Times art critic, praised advances in the gallery's position on art since its foundation, others—notably Douglas Cooper—who were familiar with contemporary European avant-garde art, such as Surrealism and German Expressionism (which was not represented at all in the Tate) considered it "hopelessly insular". Manson preferred to put on a popular show of Cricket Pictures, coinciding with the 1934 Ashes tour, and in 1935 substituted an exhibition by Professor Tonks for a proposed Sickert retrospective.

The high points of his "irregular and dull" exhibition programme were centenaries, in 1933 of the birth of Edward Burne-Jones and in 1937 of the death of John Constable. Other achievements accomplished during his term of office included a formal change of name from "National Gallery, Millbank" to "Tate Gallery" in October 1932, the planting of cherry trees outside in 1933, the installation of electric lighting in 1935 and extra toilets. Manson was on the 1932 Venice Biennale British selection committee, as well as staging shows in Brussels in 1932 and Bucharest in 1936.

=== Decline ===
Towards the end of his term of office, Manson's life declined into alcoholism; he was drunk at Board meetings and on one occasion was wrapped in a blanket and carried out after he had fallen onto the floor. He suffered a public blow to his prestige, when a staff member wrote in a catalogue that the French artist Utrillo was dead and had been "a confirmed dipsomaniac"—neither of which was true—leading to a court case with Manson named as defendant; settlement in court on 17 February 1938 included the Tate purchase of an Utrillo painting.

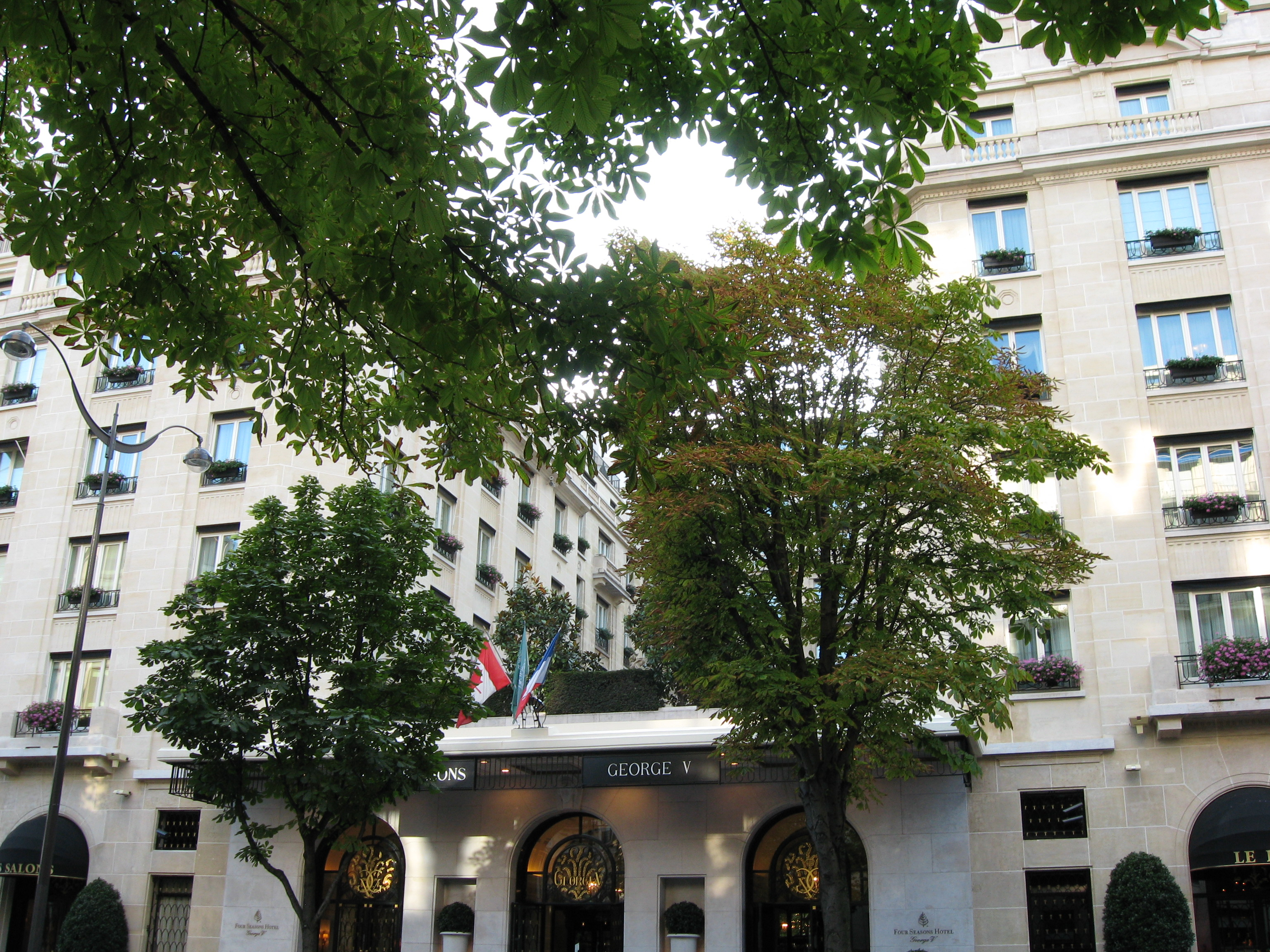
Hotel George V in Paris

On 4 March 1938, Manson attended a dinner organised by Kenneth Clark at the Hotel George V in Paris to celebrate the British Exhibition taking place at the Louvre museum. Clive Bell recorded the eventualities in a letter to his wife:

Manson arrived at the déjeuner given by the minister of Beaux Arts fantastically drunk—punctuated the ceremony with cat-calls and cock-a-doodle-doos, and finally staggered to his feet, hurled obscene insults at the company in general and the minister in particular, and precipitated himself on the ambassadress, Lady Phipps, some say with amorous intent others with lethal intent.

Bell concluded:

the guests fled ices uneaten, coffee undrunk... I hope an example will be made, and that they will seize the opportunity for turning the sot out of the Tate, not because he is a sot, but because he has done nothing but harm to modern painting.

Kenneth Clark has stated that Manson was asked to resign on health grounds because of a Foreign Office request.

Sculpture for the Blind by Constantin Brâncuși, c. 1920, veined marble; Philadelphia Museum of Art, The Louise and Walter Arensberg Collection, 1950.

In the period before a public announcement was made of his leaving the Tate, he was the cause of further controversy. A number of sculptures, chosen by Marcel Duchamp and en route from Paris to Peggy Guggenheim's London gallery, had been held by customs officers, who needed to ascertain whether they were in fact art and thus exempt from duty. In such circumstances, the arbiter was the Director of the Tate. The artists included Jean Arp and Raymond Duchamp-Villon. Manson pronounced Constantin Brâncuși's Sculpture for the Blind (a large, smooth, egg-shaped marble) to be "idiotic" and "not art". Letters were written to the press, critics signed a protest petition, and Manson was criticised in the House of Commons; he backed down.

== Retirement ==
At the age of 58, Manson announced his retirement:

My doctor has warned me that my nerves will not stand any further strain... I have begun to have blackouts, in which my actions become automatic. Sometimes these periods last several hours.... I had one of these blackouts at an official luncheon in Paris recently, and startled guests by suddenly crowing like a cock....

He applied for a pension for his twenty-five years at the Tate on the grounds of having a nervous breakdown, and received one which he said was worth £1 a day, along with the gift from staff of a paint box to upgrade his habit of carrying paint brushes in paper bags. His successor as Director, Sir John Rothenstein discovered that Manson had boosted his low salary by selling from the basement work, which was referred to by the staff as "Director's stock".

Manson left his wife and home in Hampstead Garden Suburb in order to "get away from women" and make time to paint, alighting first in Harrington Road, South Kensington, and then, not long afterwards, up the road to Boltons Studios. He settled with Elizabeth (Cecily Haywood). From 1939, he showed at the Royal Academy. He died in 1945, having observed, "The roses are dying, and so am I."

== Legacy ==
In March and April 1946, a memorial show was held at the Wildenstein Gallery in London with 59 works in oil, watercolour, etchings, drawings and pastel, dating from 1903 to 1945. A second show was held in August and September at the Ferens Art Gallery, Hull, with 58 works—32 oils, 14 watercolours and 12 pastels.

In 1973, a retrospective was held at Maltzahn Gallery, Cork Street, London. His work is in the Tate and many other galleries in Britain and abroad.

A major retrospective of the Camden Town Group was held at Tate Britain in 2008, but omitted eight of the 17 members, including Duncan Grant, James Dickson Innes, Augustus John, Henry Lamb, Wyndham Lewis and Manson, who was, according to Wendy Baron, of "too little individual character".

== Notes and references ==
Cultural offices
Preceded by Charles Aitken	Director of the Tate Gallery; 1930–1938	Succeeded by John Rothenstein
