= Ethel Sands =

American-born British artist, socialite, patron

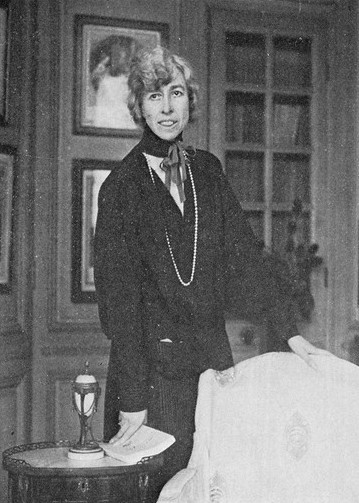
- Sands in 1922
- Born: 6 July 1873; Newport, Rhode Island, U.S.
- Died: 19 March 1962 (aged 88); London, England
- Education: Eugène Carrière
- Known for: Painting
- Partner: Anna Hope Hudson

Ethel Sands (6 July 1873 – 19 March 1962) was an American-born artist and hostess who lived in England from childhood. She studied art in Paris, where she met her life partner Anna Hope Hudson. Her works were generally still lifes and interiors, often of Château d'Auppegard that she shared with Hudson. Sands was a Fitzroy Street Group and London Group member. Her works are in London's National Portrait Gallery and other public collections. In 1916, she became a naturalised British citizen. Although a major art patron and an artist, she is most remembered as a hostess for the cultural elite, including Henry James, Virginia Woolf, Roger Fry and Augustus John.

== Early life ==
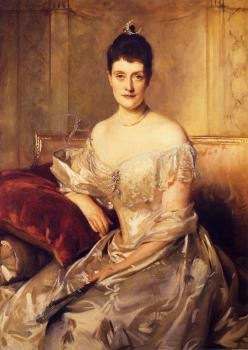
John Singer Sargent, Mrs. Mahlon Day Sands (Mary Hartpence), 1893–1894

Ethel Sands was born on 6 July 1873 in Newport, Rhode Island, the first child of Mary Morton (Hartpence) and Mahlon Day Sands, (Note: Mary Sands' maiden name is sometimes given as Hartpeace, but it is Hartpence, the daughter of Alanson Hartpence and Mary Morton Hartpence.) who married in 1872. (Note: Mahlon was previously married; his wife died in India. They had a daughter named Mabel.) Mahlon Sands was secretary of the American Free Trade League, who in 1870 advocated for civil service reform and free trade. He was partner of his deceased father's pharmaceutical importing firm, A.B. Sands and Company. Ethel had two younger brothers, Mahlon Alan and Morton Harcourt Sands, who were, respectively, 5 and 11 years younger.

In 1874, the family left the United States for England, intending to only visit the country. However, Mahlon Sands and his family stayed in England and travelled among European countries. They also visited the United States annually and were there for an extended visit from 1877 to 1879. They kept their house in Newport, Rhode Island throughout this time.

The wealthy Sands circulated among London society, including writer and statesman John Morley, politician William Ewart Gladstone, writer Henry James, artist John Singer Sargent, the Rothschild family, and Henry Graham White. Mahlon's sister, Katherine, was married to journalist and newspaper editor Edwin Lawrence Godkin. They were part of Edward VII, then Prince of Wales', social circle. (Note: Edward VII, then Prince of Wales, encouraged the Sands to stay in England.)

John Singer Sargent painted the portrait of her mother, who was considered "a famous society beauty of her day." Mary Sands was "much admired" by writer Henry James, who called her "that gracious lady" and based his heroic character "Madame de Mauves" on her. (Note: Henry James and Mary Sands kept up a relationship until her death. They attended important events in each others' lives, corresponded and had discussions about the social, literary and political issues of the day. In a letter to his brother and sister-in-law, he wrote that Mary Sands was "a pathetic, ballottée creature — with nothing small or mean and with a beauty that had once been of the greatest." Ethel became a friend of James and following his death she spoke of her memories of him on a British radio program in 1956.)

Ethel Sands was raised in a respectable upper-class household in which her parents were "happily married". While her father was considered handsome and her mother beautiful, Anthony Powell states that some people wrote in their diaries and letters that she was plain. In her later years, Powell met her and said that "so great was her elegance, charm, capacity to be amusing in a no-nonsense manner, that I could well believed her to be good-looking in her youth. Her father had ridden horseback through Hyde Park, was thrown from the horse and died an accidental death in 1888. His widow, Mary Sands, raised Ethel and her brothers until her death on 28 July 1896.

== Art ==
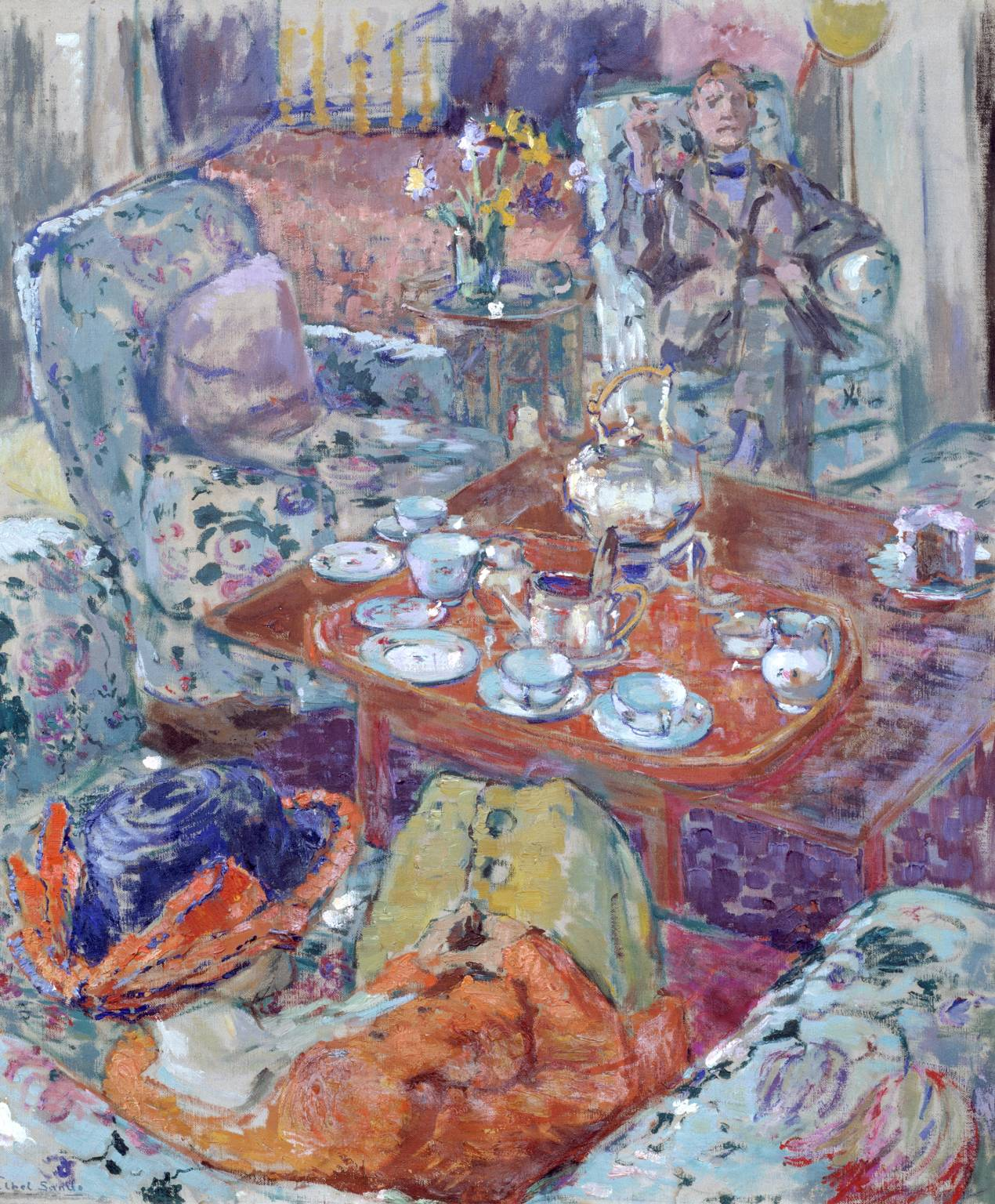
Ethel Sands, Tea with Sickert, 1911–1912, Tate

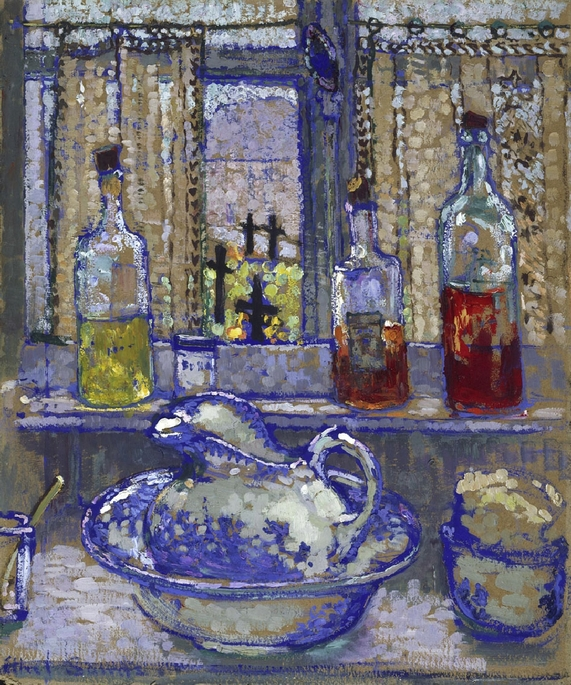
Ethel Sands, Still Life with a View over a Cemetery, by March 1923 when it was sold

=== Education ===
Encouraged by artist John Singer Sargent, Sands studied painting in Paris at the Académie Carrière under Eugène Carrière for several years, beginning in 1894. There she met fellow student Nan Hudson, born Anna Hope Hudson in the United States, who became her life partner. (Note: Wendy Baron wrote in her 1977 book, Ethel Sands and Her Circle: "They were basically two independent, individual women, whose mutual love and understanding rescued them from the loneliness of spinsterhood.) During this time, Sands became the guardian of her two younger brothers following her mother's death in 1896.

=== Painting ===
Sands painted still lifes and interior settings. Tate suggests that was inspired by Édouard Vuillard's dry brush technique, colour palette and depiction of "intimate" scenes. Her first exhibition was at Salon d'Automne in Paris in 1904.

In 1907, at Walter Sickert's invitation, she became a member and exhibited paintings she made at the Fitzroy Street Group. She also purchased the works of other artists. She was one of the artists that founded the London Group. (Note: Camden Town Group was a male-member organisation, but there were female artists like Sands, Anna Hope Hudson and Marjorie Sherlock that were involved on the periphery.) According to author Kate Deepwell, her works, and those of Vanessa Bell and other women, were evaluated differently at that time from those made by men: The best critique of woman's work at the time would be that they had individuality, but they would not have been considered innovative, modern works like those made by men.

In Paris in 1911 she had her first show dedicated to her works. Hudson and Sands had a show at Carfax Gallery in 1912. The next year she was part of the "English Post-Impressionists, Cubists and Others" show in Brighton. Her works were exhibited at Goupil Gallery, and in 1922 she had her initial solo show. She also exhibited often at the Women's International Art Club and the New English Art Club.

Hudson purchased Château d'Auppegard near Dieppe, France in 1920, which was the subject of several of Sand's paintings. Some of the interior paintings are A Spare Room, Château d'Auppegard and Double Doors, Château d'Auppegard. Other examples are the landscape Auppegard Church from Château, France and one of her partner, Nan Hudson Playing Patience at Auppegard. Her works are in the collections of Tate museum Government Art Collection, and Fitzwilliam Museum.

== Socialite and patron ==
Like Lady Sibyl Colefax and Lady Ottoline Morrell, Sands entertained artists and writers with the intention to nurture and discuss ideas relevant to their careers. Lady Ottoline Morrell "took over" Sand's Chelsea house for entertainment after she had to give up her London house at Bedford Square. Affiliated with the Bloomsbury Group, she was best-known as "one of the leading artist hostesses of her time", her lavish affairs were financially possible due to the significant wealth she inherited from her parents. She was mainly at the Oxford, Newington house until 1920, but when in England she also entertained at her London Lowndes Street house, and between 1913 and 1937 at 15 Vale, Chelsea, London house, where she lived near her mother's friend, Henry James. Notable artists Augustus John and Walter Sickert. Henry James, Virginia Woolf, Roger Fry and Arnold Bennett were among the writers of the "cultural elite" who visited her. Her friends included artist Jacques-Émile Blanche, writer Edith Wharton, poet William Butler Yeats, essayist and critic Logan Pearsall Smith and novelist Howard Overing Sturgis.

Lytton Strachey (a founder of the Bloomsbury Group) met at Sands' house and her uncle, Edwin Lawrence Godkin wrote of his upcoming visit to Sands' house in Oxfordshire, "There one fortnight, and then back to "holy wars", patriotism, and buncombe..."

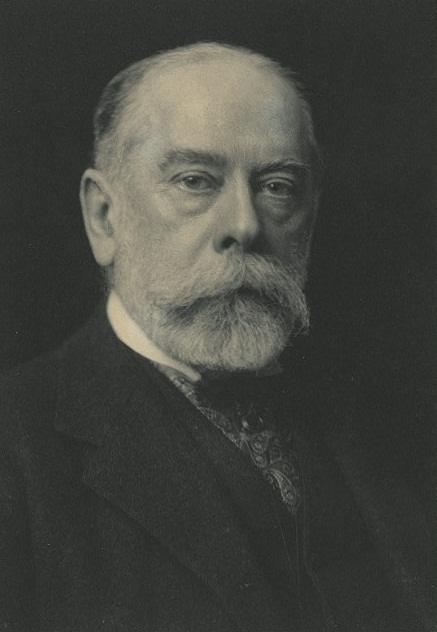
Edwin Lawrence Godkin, her uncle, a journalist and editor

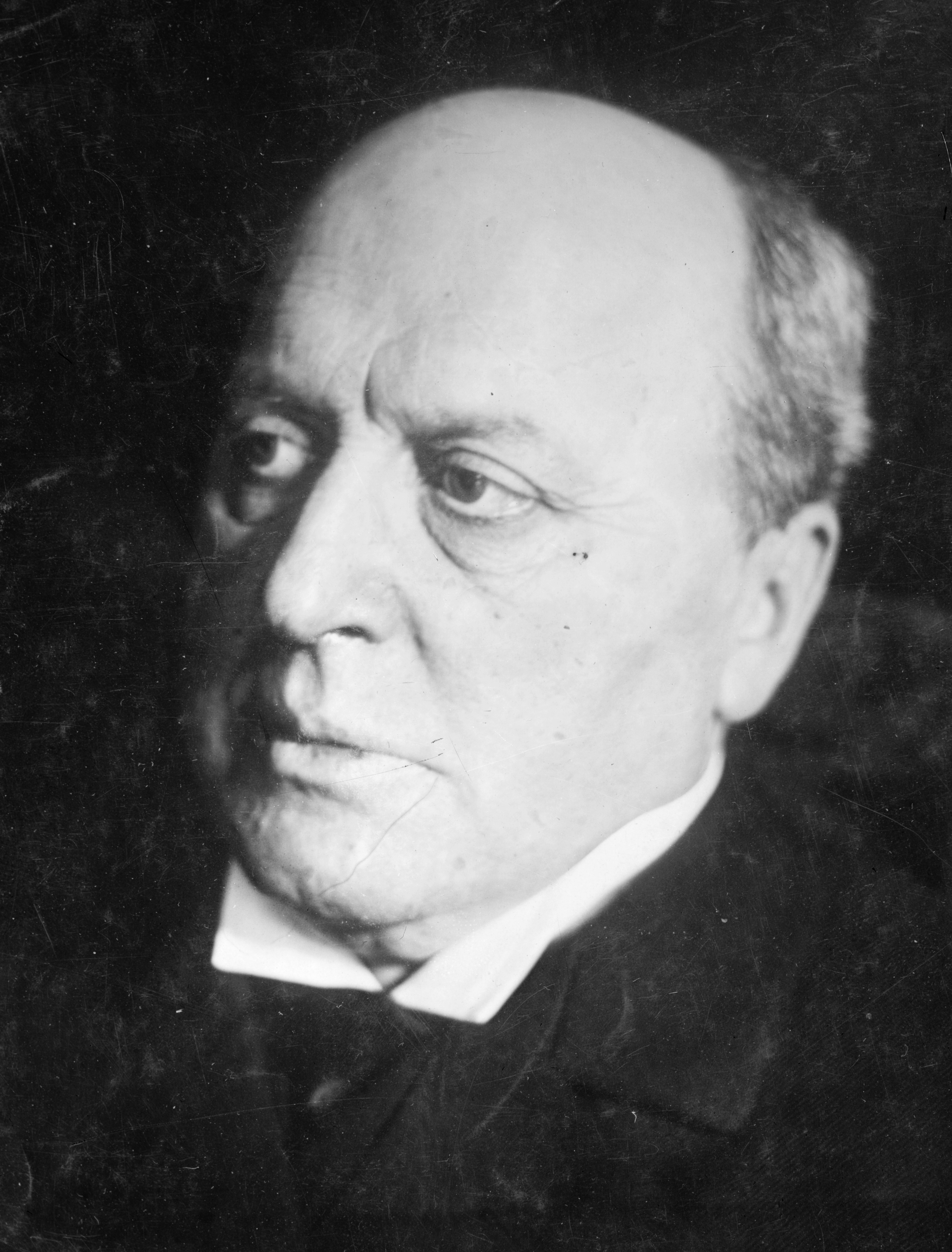
Henry James, writer, neighbour and close friend of the family

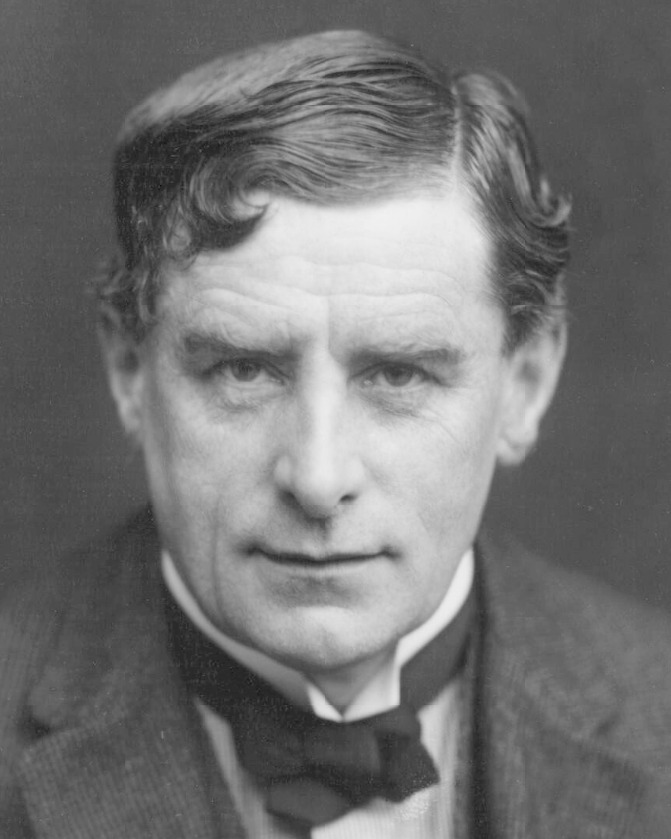
Walter Sickert, artist and mentor

She was a patron and collector of works by other contemporary artists. For instance, she commissioned Boris Anrep, a Russian immigrant, to create mosaics and murals in her Vale, Chelsea house. Sands continued to entertain into the 1950s with her friends, including Duncan Grant and Desmond MacCarthy, until he died in 1952.

She was described as a "plain woman of immense charm, cultivation and perception, and a painter of considerable talent" in the Dictionary of Real People and Places in Fiction. It was suggested there that Henry James modelled the character Nanda in The Awkward Age after Sands.

== World wars ==
Sands tended to soldiers who had been injured in France during World War I, having established a hospital for soldiers near Dieppe with Hudson. It was forced to close down, and they continued their nursing efforts in both France and England. Sands was then in Britain working as a forewoman in a factory that made overalls. In 1916 she became a British citizenship. During World War II, Sands served as a nurse. The house in Chelsea, London was destroyed during The Blitz by a parachute mine, and the house in France was broken into and its contents were stolen or destroyed. The two war-time events resulted in the loss of most of Sands' and Hudson's works.

== Personal life ==
Her mind was like her room, in which lights advanced and retreated, came pirouetting and stepping delicately, spread their tails, pecked their way; and then her whole being was suffused, like the room again, with a cloud of some profound knowledge, some unspoken regret, and then she was full of locked drawers, stuffed with letters, like her cabinets.

— Virginia Woolf, The Lady in the Looking Glass: A Reflection

Sands and Hudson divided their time between England and France to accommodate their lifestyle preferences. Hudson enjoyed living a relatively quiet life in France and Sands liked the London and Oxford social life.

Sands entertained people within and outside of the cultural elite throughout her life. When Hudson's health began to fail, Sands nursed her until she died in 1957. Sand continued to entertain after Hudson's death. Her date of death was 19 March 1962.

Friend Virginia Woolf wrote a sketch based upon her called "The Lady in the Looking Glass", subtitled "A Reflection", about a time that she saw her come "in from the garden and not reading her letters." The mirror symbolised the way in which art is used to take a snapshot in time, but can also cut.

Wendy Baron, an author and art historian, wrote a biography about Sands, partly based upon the letters that Sands exchanged with Hudson and others. Tate Archives now holds the correspondence.

== Works ==
Among the works that survived World War II plunders and bombings are:

- A Dressing Room, oil on millboard, 46 x 38 cm, The Ashmolean Museum of Art and Archaeology. Before it came to The Ashmolean, it was owned by Logan Pearsall Smith. The museum commented on the similarity of this work to paintings made by Édouard Vuillard.
- A Spare Room, Château d'Auppegard, c. 1925, oil on board, 44.5 x 53.5 cm, Government Art Collection It was exhibited at British Council, Cairo & Algiers, 1944.
- Auppegard Church from the Château, France, oil on canvas, 60 x 48 cm, City of London Corporation
- Bedroom Interior, Auppegard, France, oil on canvas, 60 x 48 cm, City of London Corporation
- Double Doors, Auppegard, France, oil on canvas, 53 x 45 cm, City of London Corporation
- Figure Seated by an Open Window, oil on canvas, 60 x 48 cm, City of London Corporation
- Flowers in a Jug, 1920s, oil on canvas, Tate
- Girl Reading on a Sofa, Auppegard, France, oil on canvas, 53 x 46 cm, City of London Corporation
- Girl Sewing, Auppegard, France, oil on canvas, 49 x 60 cm, City of London Corporation
- Interior at Portland Place, London, oil on canvas, 43 x 58 cm, City of London Corporation
- Interior with Mirror and Fireplace, oil on canvas, 65 x 53 cm, City of London Corporation
- Interior with Still Life and the Statuette of the Madonna, oil on canvas, 67.3 x 58.5 cm, Amgueddfa Cymru – National Museum Wales
- (Lloyd) Logan Pearsall Smith, 1932, oil on canvas, 61.4 x 49.8 cm, National Portrait Gallery, London
- Nan Hudson Playing Patience at Auppegard, France, oil on canvas, 64 x 52 cm, City of London Corporation
- Still Life with a View over a Cemetery, oil on board, 45 x 37.5 cm, The Fitzwilliam Museum
- Still Life with Books and Flowers, oil on canvas, 36 x 44 cm, City of London Corporation
- Tea with Sickert, c. 1911–12, oil on canvas, 61 x 51 cm, Tate
- The Bedroom at Auppegard, France, Girl Reading, oil on canvas, 51 x 61 cm, City of London Corporation
- The Chintz Couch, c. 1911–12, oil on board, 46.5 x 38.5 cm, Tate
- The Open Door, Auppegard, France, oil on canvas, 54 x 45 cm, City of London Corporation
