= Anna Hope Hudson =

American painter

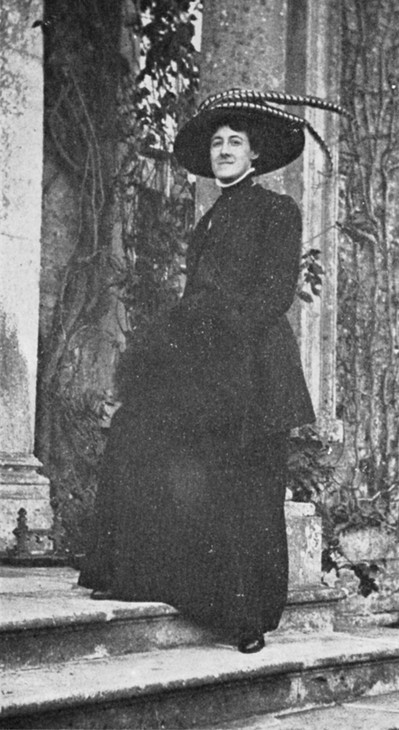
- Anna Hope (Nan) Hudson, photograph, about 1908
- Born: Anna Hope Hudson; September 10, 1869; New York City, US
- Died: September 17, 1957 (aged 88)
- Education: Eugène Carrière, Henri Evenepoel
- Known for: Painting

Anna Hope Hudson (1869–1957) was an American-born artist who lived and worked in France and England. She was a founding member of the London Group, and the life partner of likewise artist Ethel Sands.

== Early life ==
Hudson was born 10 September 1869 in New York City. She was the daughter of Colonel Edward McKenny Hudson, who died in 1892; her mother died when she was 9 years old. She lived in the United States until she was 24 when she moved to Europe, preferring France of the places she lived and visited. The inheritance that she received was the result of her grandfather's success as a partner of a banknote engraving organization, which later merged to become the American Bank Note Company.

== Education ==
Hudson began her studies in Paris in 1892 and met fellow art student Ethel Sands, who became her life partner. Like Sands, Hudson was provided a legacy upon her parents' death. They studied under Eugène Carrière in 1896. Henri Evenepoel, a Flemish painter, was Hudson's art instructor beginning in January 1897.

== Artist ==
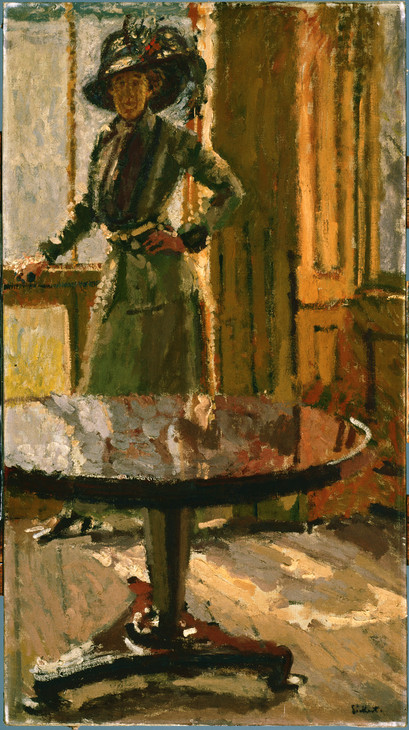
Walter Richard Sickert, Miss Hudson at Rowlandson House, 1910

Hudson lived and painted with Ethel Sands, dividing their time between France and England. Sands was a socialite who frequently entertained artists and writers when they were in England. Hudson preferred a quieter lifestyle in France, and it was there that Hudson first established herself as an artist.

She made a painting of Giudecca Canal after travelling to Venice to paint. It was shown at the Salon d'Automne in Paris in 1906. Walter Sickert, who know Hudson through her association with Sands, had not known of her works. Impressed, he shared his opinions about her talent and invited her to the Fitzroy Street Group. Sands also joined the group, where both women sometimes attended and often sent paintings for the Saturday "At Homes" sessions.

Walter Sickert, who captured her confident, independent manner in Miss Hudson at Rowlandson House that he made about 1910, described Hudson as "the radiant and dashing horsewoman of a young man's dreams." Virginia Woolf said that she dressed stylishly and was "dour and upstanding."

In England, Hudson began exhibiting her works at Leicester Galleries, the New English Art Club and the Allied Artists Association. In 1912, she had a joint show with Sands at the Carfax Gallery. The Fitzroy Street Group and the male member only Camden Town Group (Note: Camden Town Group was a male-member organization, but there were women such as Hudson, Ethel Sands and Marjorie Sherlock who were involved on the periphery.)} merged in 1913 to become the London Group, of which both Sands and Hudson were founding members. Hudson occasionally exhibited her work there until 1938. She also continued to have works shown at the English Art Club. At Sickert's invitation, Hudson occasionally work in his studios and used his models for subjects of her paintings.

Her works, inspired by Édouard Vuillard and Walter Sickert, were in large part destroyed or lost during World War II. There are some remaining works in public collections and one at the Tate.

== World wars ==
Sands and Hudson established a hospital for soldiers near Dieppe during World War I. It was forced to close down, and they continued their nursing efforts in both France and England.

During World War II, Hudson's home was pillaged and Sand's Chelsea home was destroyed during The Blitz by a parachute mine.

== Personal life ==
Hudson purchased the 17th-century house, the Château d'Auppegard, in 1920. It was located in the countryside about 10 miles from Dieppe. She had it restored and decorated her beloved house over a period of time.

Sands and Hudson lived together until her death on 17 September 1957.

== Works ==
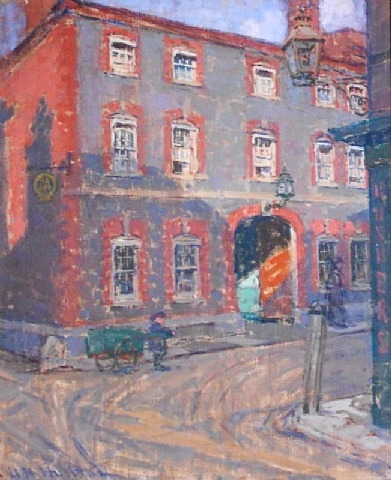
Nan Hudson, The Lamb Inn, Wallingford, 1912

Among the works that survived World War II plunders and bombings are:

- Château d'Auppegard, after 1927, oil on board, 46.2 x 38.2 cm (estimated) Tate, having been bequeathed by Colonel Christopher Sands in 2000.
- Harbour, Northern France, Dieppe,oil on board, 35 x 43 cm, Government Art Collection
- Newington House, Autumn, Oxfordshire, 1913, oil on canvas, 60.8 x 73.1 cm, Derby Museums and Art Gallery
- The Lamb Inn, Wallingford, 1912
- The Visitor, oil on canvas, 37.5 x 24.8 cm, York Museums Trust
