= Camden Town Group =

Group of English Post-Impressionist artists

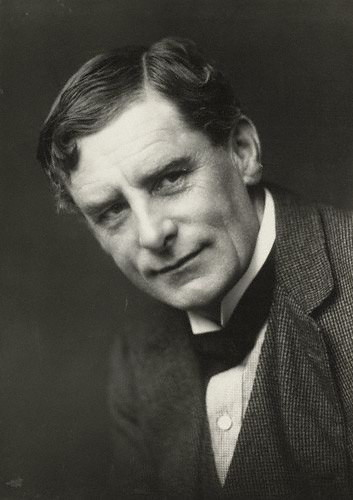
Walter Sickert

The Camden Town Group was a group of English Post-Impressionist artists founded in 1911 and active until 1913. They gathered frequently at the studio of painter Walter Sickert in the Camden Town area of London.

== History ==
In 1908, critic Frank Rutter created the Allied Artists Association (AAA), a group separate from the Royal Academy artistic societies and modelled on the French Salon des Indépendants. Many of the artists who became the Camden Town Group exhibited with the AAA.

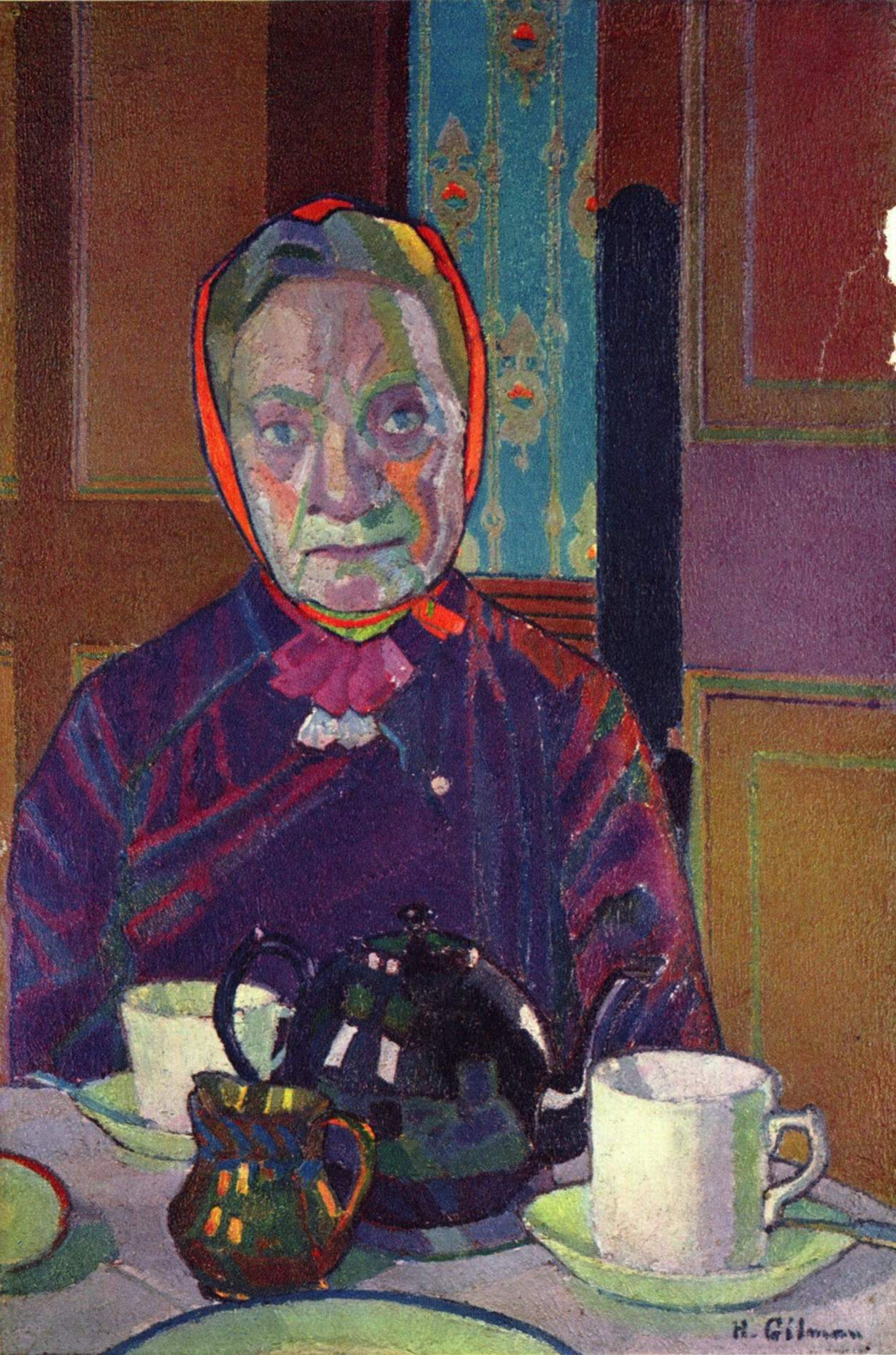
Harold Gilman. Mrs Mounter at the Breakfast Table, 1917

The members of the Camden Town Group included Walter Sickert, Harold Gilman, Spencer Frederick Gore, Lucien Pissarro (the son of French Impressionist painter Camille Pissarro), Wyndham Lewis, Walter Bayes, J. B. Manson, Robert Bevan, Augustus John, Henry Lamb, Charles Ginner, and John Doman Turner.

Influences include Vincent van Gogh and Paul Gauguin whose work can clearly be traced throughout this group's work. Their portrayal of much of London before and during World War I is historically interesting and artistically important.

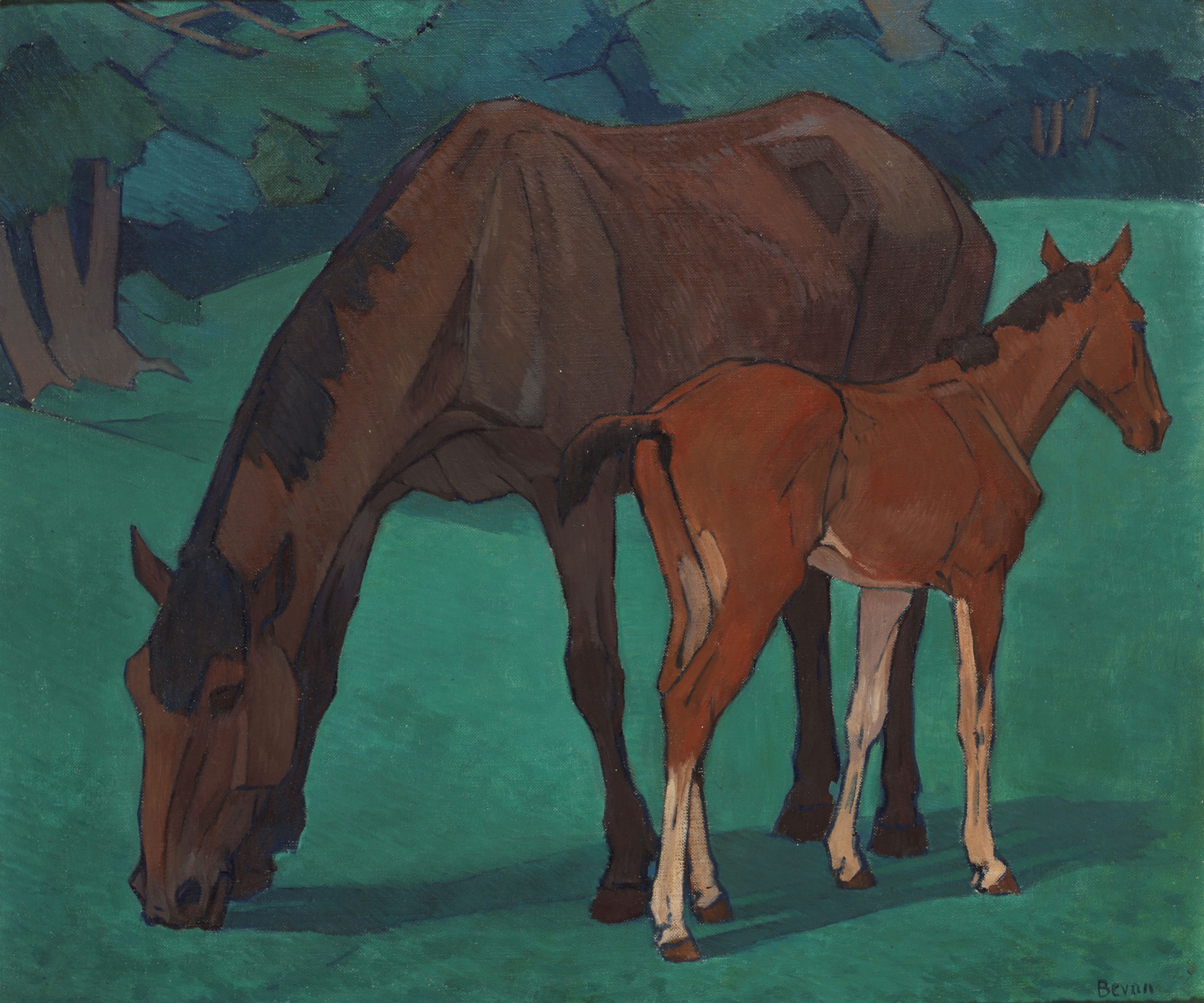
Robert Polhill Bevan. Mare and Foal, 1917

In the Cinema by Malcolm Drummond is noted for its claustrophobic feeling. It is an interesting foil to the work of Sickert who painted many rowdy music hall scenes, including Gallery of the Old Mogul (also depicting the viewers of a film). Sickert's Ennui of 1914 is often considered the masterpiece of this group's work, with its portrayal of boredom and apathy in the mold of Flaubert and others.

The group organized the exhibition of Cubist and Post-Impressionist paintings.

A major retrospective of the group's works was held at Tate Britain in London in 2008. The show did not include eight of the members, among them Duncan Grant, J. D. Innes, Augustus John, Henry Lamb, John Doman Turner, Wyndham Lewis and J. B. Manson, who was, according to Wendy Baron, of "too little individual character".

== Members ==
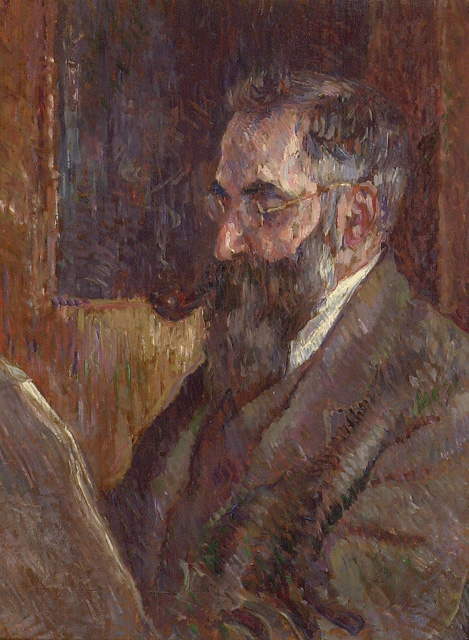
J. B. Manson. Lucien Pissarro Reading, est. 1913

It was decided that there should be a 16-member, men only, limit on the group: Maxwell Gordon Lightfoot died after the first exhibition, and Duncan Grant was elected to take his place.

- Walter Bayes
- Robert Bevan
- Malcolm Drummond
- Harold Gilman
- Charles Ginner
- Spencer Frederick Gore
- Duncan Grant
- James Dickson Innes
- Augustus John
- Henry Lamb
- Wyndham Lewis
- Maxwell Gordon Lightfoot
- J. B. Manson
- Lucien Pissarro
- William Ratcliffe
- Walter Sickert
- John Doman Turner

Although women were excluded from the Camden Town Group, a few women artists like Ethel Sands, Anna Hope Hudson and Marjorie Sherlock were involved on the periphery; others, like Sylvia Gosse, were cut out altogether.

== Gallery ==
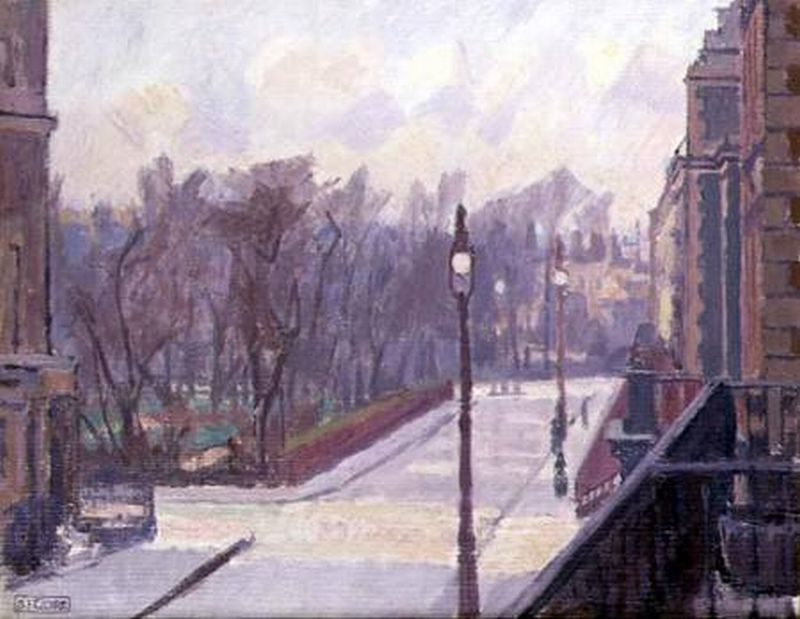
Spencer Gore. Hartington Square

Letchworth Station by Spencer Gore, 1912

Piccadilly Circus by Charles Ginner, 1912

The West Pier, Brighton by Spencer Gore, 1913

The Integrity of Belgium by Walter Sickert, 1914

Queen's Road Station, Bayswater by Walter Sickert, 1916

All Saints' Church, Hastings by Lucien Pissarro, 1918

== See also ==
- Frank Rutter
- John Doman Turner
- The London Group
