= Spencer Gore (artist) =

English painter (1878–1914)

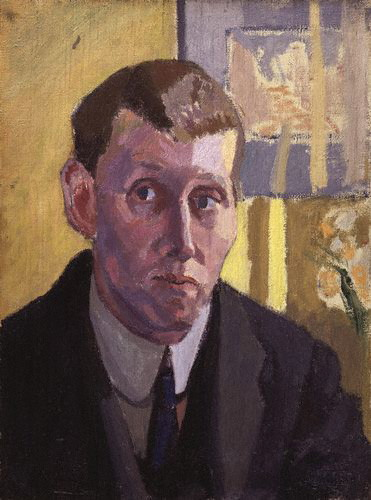
Self-portrait

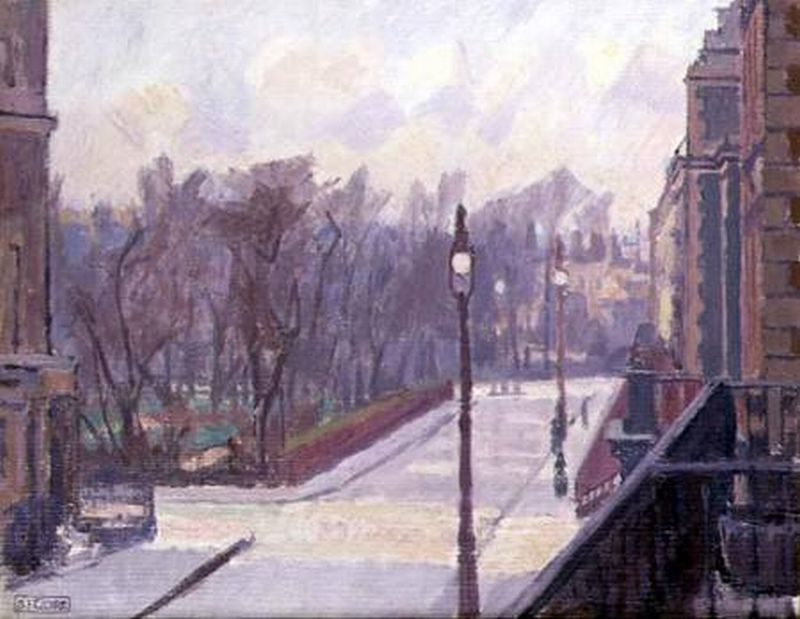
Hartington Square

Spencer Frederick Gore (26 May 1878 – 27 March 1914) was a British painter of landscapes, music-hall scenes and interiors, usually with single figures. He was the first president of the Camden Town Group, and was influenced by the Post-Impressionists.

== Early years ==
He was born on 26 May 1878 at Epsom in Surrey, the youngest of the four children of the Wimbledon tennis champion, Spencer Gore and his wife Amy Margaret (née Smith). His father's brother was the theologian Charles Gore. His father sent him to board at Harrow School in Middlesex (now Greater London). He went on to study painting in London at the Slade School of Fine Art, where he was a contemporary of Harold Gilman.

== Painting career ==
In 1904 Albert Rutherston introduced Gore to Walter Sickert at Dieppe; and afterwards he associated in Fitzroy Street, London, with Sickert, Lucien Pissarro, Harold Gilman and Charles Ginner. In 1909 he became a member of the New English Art Club, and in 1910 contributed an article to The Art News on "The Third London Salon of the Allied Artists Association".

In 1911 he was a co-founder and first president of the Camden Town Group. There is a Blue plaque at 31 Mornington Crescent where he lived and worked between 1909 and 1912.

In January 1912 he married Mary Joanna ("Molly") Kerr, with whom he had two children – Margaret Elizabeth (1912–1994) and Frederick John Pym (1913–2009); the latter would become well known as the painter Frederick Gore. His widow died at Meopham, Kent in 1968.

In 1913 he became a member of the London Group.

His later works show growing concern with pictorial construction, under the influence of the Post-Impressionists. He experimented with colour in his works, as may be seen in his painting Hartington Square.

Gore painted a series of thirty-two landscapes in Richmond Park during the last months of his life. His painting From a Window in Cambrian Road, Richmond shows the view from a top-floor window at the rear of 6 Cambrian Road, near the park's Cambrian Gate entrance, where he and his family moved to in 1913. This may be the last picture Gore worked on before his death. According to Tate curator Helena Bonett, Gore's early death from pneumonia, two months before what would have been his 36th birthday, was brought on by his painting outdoors in Richmond Park in the cold and wet winter months.

Gore's painting Richmond Park, thought to have been painted in the autumn of 1913 or shortly before the artist's death in March 1914, was exhibited at the Paterson and Carfax Gallery in 1920. In 1939 it was exhibited in Warsaw, Helsinki and Stockholm by the British Council as Group of Trees. It is now in the collection of the Tate Gallery under its original title but is not currently on display. It is not certain where in the park the picture was made but a row of trees close to the pond near Cambrian Gate has a very close resemblance to those in the painting. Another Gore painting, with the same title (Richmond Park), painted in 1914, is at the Ashmolean Museum. His painting Wood in Richmond Park is in the Birmingham Art Gallery's collection.

Two of Gore's artworks, Brighton Pier and Richmond Houses, appear in the first number of the landmark modernist journal, BLAST, published some three months after Gore's death. There features also an obituary piece by Wyndham Lewis, who edited the magazine, and who eulogises Gore's "dogged, almost romantic industry, his passion for the delicate objects set in the London atmosphere around him, his grey conception of the artist's life, his gentleness and fineness, [which] would have matured into an abundant personal art".

He died at Richmond, Surrey, on 27 March 1914, aged 35 and was buried in Hertingfordbury in Hertfordshire, where his mother lived.

== Teaching ==
Spencer Gore gave John Doman Turner artistic training from 1908 to 1913 in a series of thirty letters. The teaching was probably carried out via correspondence because Doman Turner was deaf. The letters are now held in the Gore family collection. Doman Turner was a member of the Camden Town Group, having been elected by Gore, but was shy and unsure of his abilities, which probably led him to resign his membership of the London Group soon after it was formed on 27 November 1913.

== Gallery ==
Rule Britannia, 1910

Letchworth Station, 1912

The West Pier, Brighton, 1913

== Bibliography ==
- Bonett, Helena. "Spencer Gore 1878–1914", artist biography, September 2009, in Bonett, Helena; Holt, Ysanne; Mundy, Jennifer (eds.), The Camden Town Group in Context, Tate, May 2012, tate.org.uk
- Upstone, Robert. Modern Painters: The Camden Town Group, exhibition catalogue, Tate Britain, London, 2008. ISBN 1-85437-781-7
