= Edna Mann =

British painter (1926–1985)

- Edna Mann, 1963
- Born: 1926; London, UK
- Died: 1985 (aged 58–59)
- Known for: Painting, Writing

Edna Mann (1926 – 1985) was a British painter and co-founder of the Borough Group of artists.

== Early life and education ==
Edna Mann was born in London in 1926. She was educated at Romford County High School for Girls and then studied art at the South-East Essex Technical College and School of Art. In 1942, she met the artists David Bomberg (1890–1957), who was teaching there, and Dorothy Mead. Mead and Mann were initially sceptical of Bomberg's teaching style but were won over by his unconventional approach. She won a scholarship to the Royal College of Art in 1945, but left after a year because of opposition to Bomberg's ideas.

Edna Mann and Dorothy Mead followed Bomberg to the City Literary Institute, where they met Cliff Holden, and then the Borough Polytechnic (now London South Bank University) from 1946.

== Career ==
She was a founding member of the Borough Group a group of artists influenced by Bomberg at Borough Polytechnic, together with Cliff Holden (the first president), Dorothy Mead and Peter Richmond. The Borough Group's first exhibition was held in June 1947 at the Archer Gallery. Edna Mann and the Borough Group had a group show at the Everyman Cinema, in Hampstead in December 1947. The exhibition included works by Cliff Holden, Dorothy Mead, Miles Richmond, Dinora and Leslie Marr and Lilian Holt. She exhibited with the group until she became pregnant, when Bomberg asked her to resign. He believed that it was impossible to be a serious artist while raising young children.

Mann co-wrote a radio play with Frank Hitchcock, Nigel Graham and Anthony Hall entitled "The Leavers" that was performed on the BBC in February 1965.

Mann was part of the Harlow Arts Festival and also held her first solo exhibition at the Drian Gallery in 1965.

A number of her works are held in the Sarah Rose Collection at London South Bank University and an exhibition of her works alongside those of Dorothy Mead took place at the Borough Road Gallery in early 2024.

== Works ==
- Bent Figure, Charcoal on paper (c 1949) in the collection of Borough Road Gallery
- Cityscape Charcoal and chalk on paper (c 1949) in the collection of Borough Road Gallery
- Exterior of Westminster Abbey Charcoal on paper (1946) in the collection of Borough Road Gallery
- Interior, St Paul’s Cathedral Charcoal on paper (1946) in the collection of Borough Road Gallery
- Interior St Paul’s Cathedral Charcoal and blue wash (1946) in the collection of Borough Road Gallery
- Interior St Paul’s Cathedral Charcoal and yellow wash (c 1949) in the collection of Borough Road Gallery
