= Borough Road Gallery =

Coordinates: 51°29′55″N 0°6′6″W

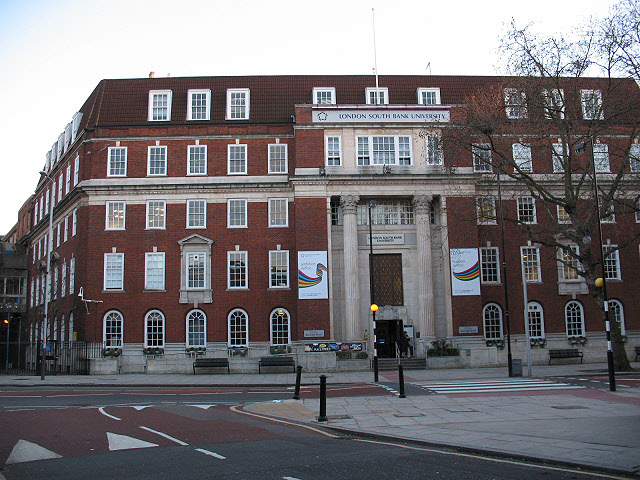
Entrance to the Borough Road Gallery at 103 Borough Road in London.

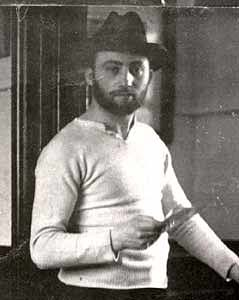
The painter David Bomberg, whose pictures feature in the Borough Road Gallery.

The Borough Road Gallery is an art gallery at London South Bank University on Borough Road in south London, England.

The gallery celebrates the artist David Bomberg who taught at the Borough Polytechnic, now London South Bank University. The gallery includes the Sarah Rose Collection of his pictures and those of other artists in the Borough Group, totalling around 150 works.

The gallery opened in June 2012, financed by the UK Heritage Lottery Fund. Artists whose works are featured include: David Bomberg (1890–1957), Dennis Creffield (born 1931), Cliff Holden (born 1919), Thomas Holden (born 1957), Edna Mann (1926–1985), Dorothy Mead (1928–1975), and Miles Richmond (1922–2008).

== See also ==
- Borough Group
