= Russian Ballet (book) =

1919 artist's book by David Bomberg

- Author: David Bomberg
- Publication date: 1919

Russian Ballet is an artist's book by the English artist David Bomberg published in 1919. The work describes the impact of seeing a performance of Diaghilev's Ballets Russes, and is based on a series of drawings Bomberg had done around 1914, while associated with the Vorticist group of avant-garde artists in London. Centred on Wyndham Lewis and Ezra Pound, the movement flourished briefly from 1914–1915, before being dispersed by the impact of the First World War. The only surviving example of a vorticist artist's book, the work can be seen as a parody of Marinetti's seminal futurist book Zang Tumb Tumb, using similar language to the Italian's work glorifying war (for example, the phrase "Methodic discord startles ..."), but instead praising the impact of watching the decidedly less macho Ballets Russes in full flow.

Bomberg was the most audacious painter of his generation at the Slade, proving ... that he could absorb the most experimental European ideas, fuse these with Jewish influences and come up with a robust alternative of his own. His treatment of the human figure, in terms of angular, clear-cut forms charged with enormous energy, reveals his determination to bring about a drastic renewal in British painting. —Richard Cork

The book was the last time that Bomberg would work in a vorticist idiom. After witnessing the carnage of the First World War at first hand, he was to lose his faith in modernism and instead develop a looser, expressive style, based predominantly around landscapes.

== Vorticism and the English Avant-garde ==
Bomberg had been expelled from the Slade art school in 1913 due to his modernist leanings, and after a brief flirtation with Futurism, had put on a major one-man exhibition of Abstract art at the Chenil Gallery, Chelsea, July 1914. The exhibition included paintings such as The Mud Bath and Ju-Jitsu. The show was enthusiastically reviewed by T. E. Hulme. Visited by Raymond Duchamp-Villon, Brâncuși and Marinetti among others, the exhibition earned 'him the admiration of many experimental artists both in London and abroad.

The foreword of the Chenil Gallery catalogue, 1914, contained a defiant text not dissimilar to Wyndham Lewis' Manifesto in Blast 1, and one that could just as easily apply to the drawings done around this time that would serve as the basis of Russian Ballet;

I appeal to the Sense of Form. In some of the work I show in the first room, I completely abandon Naturalism and Tradition. I am searching for an Intenser expression. In other work in this room, where I use naturalistic Form, I have stripped it of all irrelevant matter. I look upon nature, while I live in a steel city. Where decoration happens, it is accidental. My object is the construction of Pure Form. I reject everything in painting that is not Pure Form. I hate the colours of the East, the Modern Mediævalist, and the Fat Man of the Renaissance. —David Bomberg, 1914

While usually considered a vorticist, Bomberg had refused to sign the Vorticist manifesto published in BLAST, July 1914, or allow Lewis to reproduce his work in the magazine alongside contributions from T. S. Eliot, Ezra Pound, Edward Wadsworth, Ford Madox Ford and Jacob Epstein, among others. The only official connection was when he agreed to exhibit with the Vorticists at their single English exhibition at the Doré Gallery, London, in July 1915. His work was placed in a separate room as part of the 'invited to show' section.

=== Origins of Russian Ballet ===
The first series of watercolours of Dancers came about when Bomberg followed his then-girlfriend Sonia Cohen down to Southbourne to watch her 'cavorting around' in an open-air summer dance school. A bit later, while Bomberg was living in a 'house for artists' in Primrose Hill, he met Alice Mayes, a dancer for Kosslov's Ballet Company (stand-ins for Diaghilev's company) who had been invited to the house to demonstrate 'Russian Dance Steps.' One of these drawings was reproduced on the cover of his friend John Rodker's first edition of poetry, 1914.

Diaghilev's company had first visited London in 1911, returning regularly before war broke out. In 1914, when the drawings are thought to have been done, their London programme included Strauss' La légende de Joseph and Rimsky-Korsakov's Le Coq d'Or, with sets designed by Natalia Goncharova. After the war, the ballet made a triumphant return to London with the premiere of La Boutique Fantasque by Rossini with sets by André Derain. It seems likely that this much-heralded return prompted Bomberg to revisit the earlier drawings and publish them as a book, cashing in on the attendant publicity. If so, the plan failed; Bomberg, his wife Alice Mayes and a friend were ejected from the stalls when Diaghilev discovered them attempting to sell the newly printed book to the assembled patrons;

Russian Ballet" was not a programme, nor even a Souvenir. It was an effort of David's while he was hanging about waiting for the Canadians to decide what they would do about his drawings for the War Memorial, just to keep him happy and relaxed.... In one of his madcap moods, he and a friend (and I) went among the people in the stalls pretending to be selling programmes at 2/6d a time. Of course, Diagileff soon got wind of what was going on and naturally would have none of it, the buyers were reimbursed and the "programmes" collected and together with David and friend and myself, were chased up into the nine-penny gallery where we belonged. David took his hundred unsold copies to Henderson's Bomb Shop in Charing Cross Road, where they were put out for sale and about ten were sold [until] Henderson withdrew them as unsaleable. —Alice Mayes

=== The book ===
Methodic Discord Startles ..., a double spread in Russian Ballet, 1919

Russian Ballet is a small softback book featuring 6 coloured lithographs, each one facing a line from a poem celebrating the experience of watching the Ballet Russe. The prints are almost entirely abstract, and evoke the disorientating mood without recourse to specific detail. The entire poem, also written by Bomberg, reads:

—Methodic discord startles
—Insistent snatchings drag fancy from space
—Fluttering white hands beat—compel. Reason concedes
—Impressions crowding collide with movement round us
——the curtain falls—the created illusion escapes
—The mind clamped fast captures only a fragment, for new illusion

Bomberg, who had trained as a lithographer, printed the images; his wife sewed the binding.

The book was supposedly printed in an edition of 100. After being withdrawn from Henderson's Bomb Shop, Charing Cross Road, the remaining stock was bought by Jacob Mendelson, who had helped finance the project in the first place with a £30 investment. These remainders stayed in storage until the 1960s, when interest in Bomberg began to be rekindled. No sooner had Mendelson started to sell off the copies that had been in storage for 40 years, than most of the remaining books were destroyed in a fire.

== Demobilization ==
Bomberg had spent time in the trenches of the Western Front, first with the Royal Engineers from November 1915, then with the King's Royal Rifle Corps from 1916. The experience destroyed his faith in mechanized progress. He was demobbed in 1918, and given a commission by the Canadian War Memorials Fund, though he was warned to ’steer clear of Cubism and Futurism’.

His first version of ‘Sappers at Work: A Canadian Tunnelling Company’ retained 'much of the freedom of colour and structure he had developed in the pre-war period, but [introduced] recognizable figures that no longer conform to the mechanistic vision of the Mud Bath.' It was rejected out of hand as a 'futurist abortion.' It was while he was going through the protracted negotiations that led to the acceptance of the second version, an almost photorealist work, that he decided to revisit the drawings that became Russian Ballet. This return to Vorticist ideas would be the last time Bomberg dealt in abstraction; despite being one of the first artists in Europe to develop a fully realised abstract style, the new work he developed in the twenties would tend toward expressive, loosely handled landscapes.

=== Posthumous reception ===
More-or-less ignored for the rest of his life, Bomberg's reputation has continued to grow since his death in 1957. His work is now held in a number of major museums worldwide, including the Tate, National Galleries of Scotland, National Gallery of Canada, Ashmolean, Cleveland Museum of Art and Philadelphia Museum of Art. Russian Ballet has entered a number of prestigious collections including the V&A, British Library, Tate, UCLA and the National Gallery of Australia.
