= Borough Road =

Street in the London Borough of Southwark

Coordinates: 51.49906°N 0.10118°W

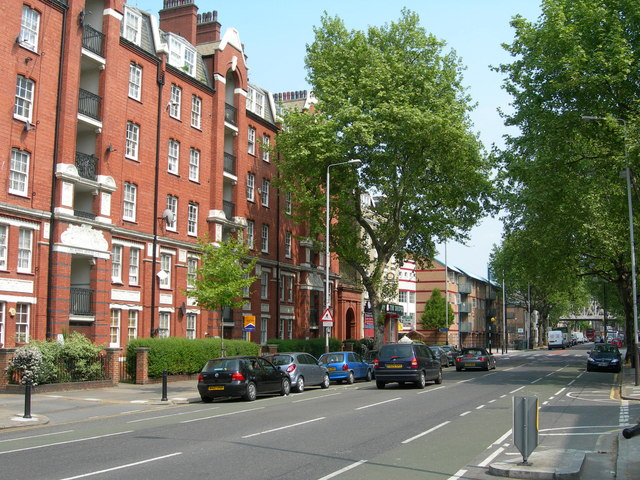
Borough Road, looking from St George's Circus towards Borough

Borough Road is in Southwark, London SE1. It runs east–west between St George's Circus and Borough High Street.

== History and location ==
The route was created as part of the planning and road improvements associated with the completion of Westminster Bridge in 1750, to provide access to Southwark from the north-west 'West End' without having to travel through the City of London. Southwark Bridge Road crosses Borough Road north-south about halfway along. The railway to Blackfriars station also passes overhead at the junction where there had been Borough Road Station.

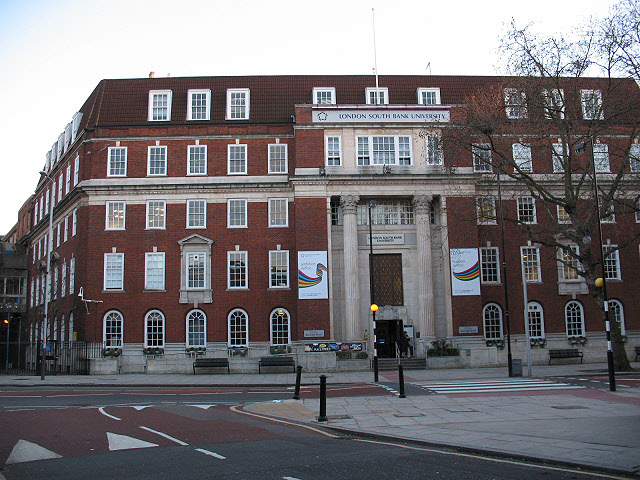
Main entrance to London South Bank University at 103 Borough Road.

The campus of London South Bank University lies to the south between St George's Circus and the junction with Southwark Bridge Road. The main entrance lies on Borough Road and is also LSBU's main address. The building where this entrance is located is known as the Borough Road Building, at 103 Borough Road.

The London School of Musical Theatre is based at 83 Borough Road. The Borough Road Gallery, featuring paintings by David Bomberg and the Borough Group, opened in 2012 in the main Borough Road Building of London South Bank University.

Other adjoining roads include Blackfriars Road, London Road and Newington Causeway.

Position: grid reference TQ319795

== History of education on Borough Road ==
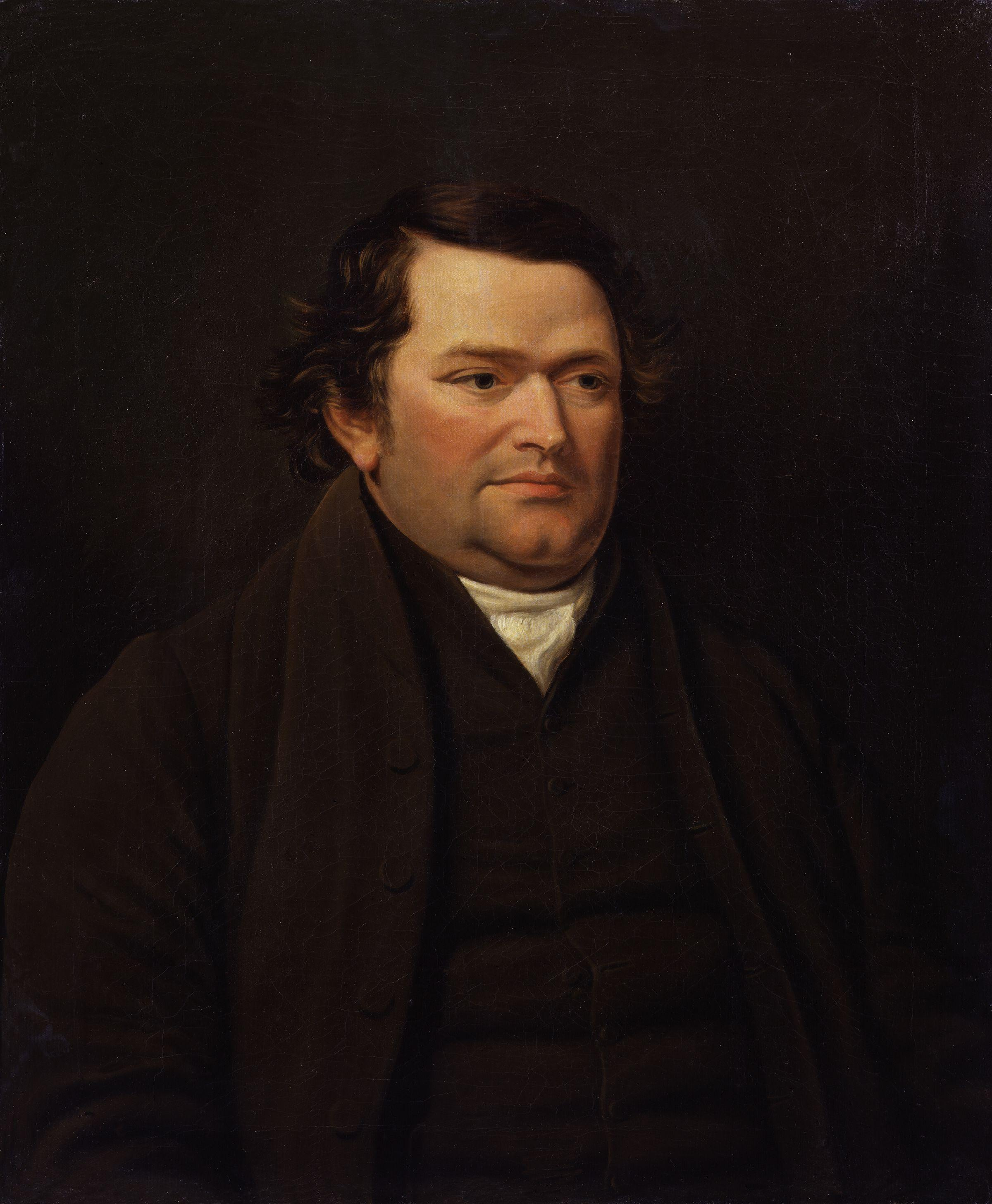
Joseph Lancaster, who founded a universal free school on Borough Road in 1798.

Borough Road has been a site of educational activity for over two centuries. Joseph Lancaster's School was established by the Quaker, Joseph Lancaster, on this road in 1798. It was an early and innovative example of a universal free school, based on the monitorial system, that became known as a British School.

An associated teacher training institute, Borough Road College, was established soon afterwards in 1804, also in Borough Road. In 1889, the college moved to Isleworth, west London. Much later, in 1975, Borough Road College merged with Maria Grey Training College to form the West London Institute of Higher Education. This then became the Osterley Campus of Brunel University from 1995 to 2006.

London South Bank University was established on Borough Road as the Borough Polytechnic Institute in 1892, soon after Borough Road College had moved. The associated National School of Bakery was founded two years later in 1894 and is now the oldest bakery school in the world. The Institute expanded and became the Polytechnic of the South Bank (1970), South Bank Polytechnic (1987), attaining university status as South Bank University in 1992, before adopting its current name in 2003. A bust of Joseph Lancaster, given by the Victorian philanthropist John Passmore Edwards, remains at the university.

More recently, the London School of Musical Theatre was founded by Glenn Lee.

== Churches ==
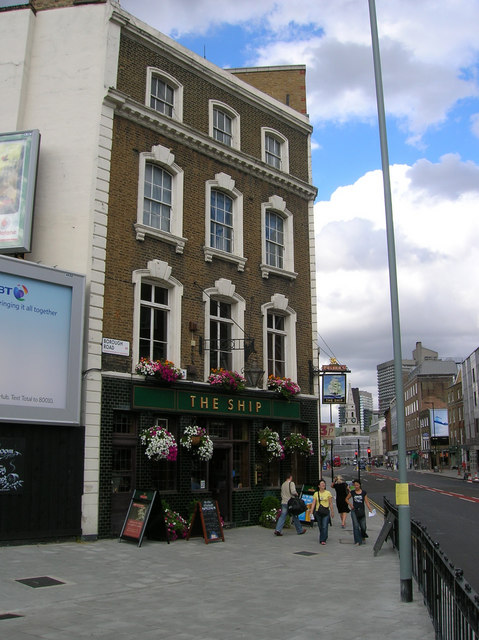
The Ship public house on Borough Road at the junction with Borough High Street.

The following were listed as being on Borough Road in the Dickens's Dictionary of London (1888 edition):

- Baptist Church (1674)
- Congregational Church (1866)
