= Norman Sillman =

British sculptor and coin designer (1921–2013)

Norman Henry Sillman, ARCA, FRBS (4 May 1921 – 18 July 2013) was a British sculptor and a coin designer, including the one pound coins for the Royal Mint.

== Early life ==
Sillman was born in London in 1921. In 1924, the family moved to Pyramid Hill, Australia, where his father farmed. Due to severe drought they returned to England in 1934.

He commenced his art studies in September 1935 at Blackheath School of Art. His tutor was James Woodford RA. As the art school was bombed during the Blitz of 1940, he was unable to take his final examination but he had already been accepted for the Royal College of Art and awarded a scholarship by the London County Council. He began his studies there in September 1940 at their wartime quarters in Ambleside before entering the army in April 1941.

== War service ==
Sillman first served with the 423 Battery London Scottish Royal Artillery and was later transferred to train at the Royal Artillery counter-battery Survey at Larkhill. In late 1942, he was sent to Egypt and then to Tripoli to join the 3rd Survey Regiment of the Eighth Army group, with whom he took part in the invasion of Sicily at Syracuse and the invasion of Italy at Reggio Calabria. The regiment continued in action through Italy until the end of the war in 1945. They were in action at most of the major engagements: Isernia, the Sangro, Monte Cassino, the Gothic Line and the hills before Bologna for the final winter before the advance to Trieste. He was wounded at Rio Nero in November 1943. They were stationed at Ronchi dei Legionari near Monfalcone during the Trieste crisis. Sillman described his service as "not all excitement, a lot of the time both sides sat staring at each other until someone started shelling".

He received home leave in September 1945 and married Gillian Drake (1921–2007) who was serving with the Auxiliary Territorial Service. Before demobilisation in December 1946 he spent three months at the Accademia di Belle Arti in Florence under the Army Education Scheme.

== Art groups and commissions ==
After the war, Sillman returned to his studies at the Royal College of Art and completed his studies under Frank Dobson RA and John Skeaping RA. His wife, Gillian, continued her studies at the Central School of Art. Their daughter Caroline was born 15 September 1947.

He was awarded his ARCA degree in 1949 and became a sculptor in London until late 1956. During this time he carried out various commissions, exhibited and taught part-time at the Borough Polytechnic (now London South Bank University) and South East Essex Technical College Art Schools. He spent a considerable amount of time drawing at the London Zoo, as the basis for animal sculptures. During this time he exhibited regularly at the Royal Academy, R.B.A., London Group, S.E.A. and other shows. In 1956 he was appointed Head of Sculpture at Nottingham College of Art (now part of Nottingham Trent University). During these freelance years he worked in wood, stone, terracotta and clay for bronze and ciment fondu. He also made small scale models for model soldier company Britains Ltd including the "Trojans Warriors" designed in 1957.

He received his first commission for a coin from the Royal Mint in 1956 (for Bermuda) and became a Fellow of the Royal British Society of Sculptors in 1959.

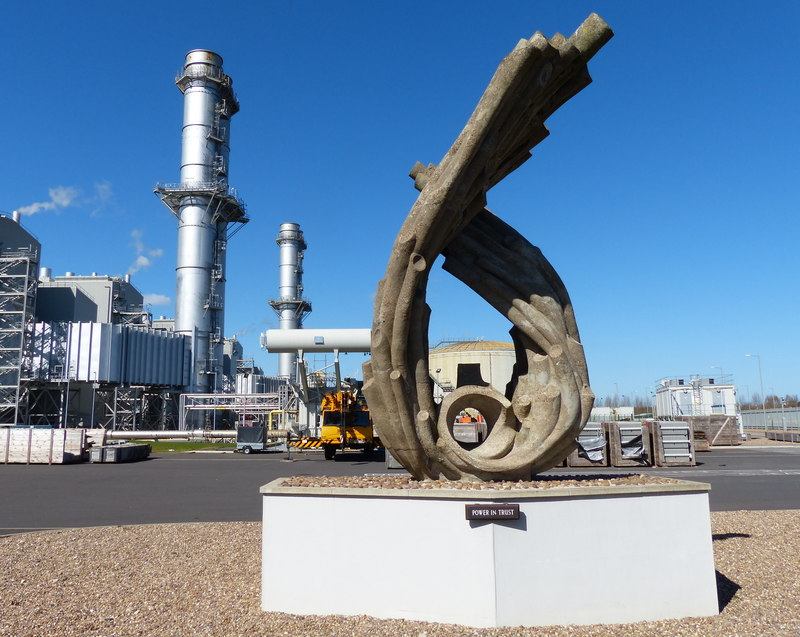
Power in Trust (1961) at Staythorpe Power Station near Nottingham

In Nottingham, he continued with commissioned works (including in 1961 the six-metre Power in Trust sculpture at Staythorpe Power Station near Nottingham) and exhibiting at the R.A. and other annual shows as well as coin and medal designing for various mints (The Royal Mint, Birmingham Mint, York (Birmingham) Mint, Metalimport, Sandhill Ltd, Danbury Mint USA, Franklin Mint USA, Glendinning USA, etc.) Over the years he designed numerous medals for Britain and abroad, and coins for some 30 countries. For Britain he designed the Scottish Commonwealth Games £2 piece and the four most recent £1 coin reverses.

He became a committee member of the Midland Group of Artists, Nottingham, and a member of the Federation Internationale de la Medaille and exhibited with them overseas.

When the Nottingham College of Art became part of Trent Polytechnic he became senior Lecturer in the Fine Art Department. Later he gave courses of lectures for the Art History Department and toward the last, before retirement, a course of studies in Tribal Arts. It was through his work in this area that he wrote and published several articles in journals, of an "Archaeological/Anthropological" nature.

He retired from Trent Polytechnic in 1983 and moved from Collingham, Nottinghamshire to Eye, Suffolk, where he continued to design coins, medals and other sculpture. He was elected to Eye Town (parish) Council and served from 1991 to 1999.

His main interests outside his work were natural history, archaeology, anthropology, ancient history, mythology and art history, mainly in the areas of ancient civilisations and tribal art.
