= South-East Essex Technical College and School of Art =

Former technical school in East London, England

Coordinates: 51°33′5″N 0°6′38″E

The South-East Essex Technical University and School of Art (aka Dagenham School of Art) was a technical college and school of art based in Longbridge Road, Dagenham, a suburb in east London, formerly in Essex, England.

== History ==
The Becontree estate was the largest public housing project in the world when it was completed in the mid-1930s. Recognising the need for education but with no responsibility to provide it, the London County Council transferred 24 acres on the western edge of the estate to Essex County Council, who built a technical college (the South East Essex Technical College) and a secondary school (South East Essex County Technical High School) on the site. The college opened in 1936, in a building designed by J. Stuart.

During World War II, the college was requisitioned by the UK military and used for training. The site's secondary school was relocated to Somerset during this period. The school returned to its original location after the war, but in 1960 it moved to Cannington Road and was renamed the South East Essex Technical High School. The technical college was renamed Barking Regional College of Technology in 1965, following the creation of the London Borough of Barking. In 1969 it became the Barking Campus of the North East London Polytechnic, which in turn became the Polytechnic of East London in 1988 and the University of East London in 1992. In 2006 the campus was closed and sold for redevelopment. In 2012, the former main building was being marketed as "Mayesbrook Manor" to potential occupants. New buildings on the rest of the site were collectively named Academy Central.

== Notable alumni ==
- Ron Embleton (1930–1988) — comics artist and illustrator
- Edna Mann (1926–1985) — painter and founding member of the Borough Group
- Dorothy Mead (1928–1975) — painter and founding member of the Borough Group
- Jeremy Ratter (aka Penny Rimbaud, born 1943) — drummer, writer, and poet

== Notable teachers ==
- N. M. H. Lightfoot (1902–1962) – Principal 1943 to 1950
- David Bomberg (1890–1957) — painter
- Norman Sillman (1921-2013) — sculptor and coin designer
- Eric Baker (activist) (1920–1976) – General Secretary and a founder of Amnesty International; a founder of Campaign for Nuclear Disarmament.

== See also ==
- Barking and Dagenham College
