= Andrew Forge =

English painter

Andrew Murray Forge (10 November 1923, Hastingleigh, Kent – 4 September 2002, New Milford, Connecticut, United States) was an English painter, academic, and art critic.

After Leighton Park School, Forge studied art at the Camberwell School of Art in London, England, under William Coldstream and Victor Pasmore in the 1940s. From 1950 to 1964, Forge was a senior lecturer at the Slade School of Art in central London, where he met Dorothy Mead in the 1950s, a former member of the Borough Group, when she was a mature student at the Slade. He showed with the London Group of artists from as early as 1950. He formally joined the London Group in 1960, the same year as Mead, and was president from 1966 to 1971. He was succeeded as president by Mead. From 1964 to 1970, Forge was Head of the Department of Fine Art at Goldsmiths College in southeast London. From 1971 to 1972, he was a lecturer in the Department of Art at the University of Reading.

Andrew Forge emigrated to the United States and was Visiting Professor at Cooper Union, New York (1973–74), Associate Dean, New York Studio School (1974–75), Visiting Professor (1975–2002). He became Professor of Painting at Yale University (1975–91), Dean of the School of Art (1975–83), and Emeritus William Leffingwell Professor of Painting (1991–94). In 1992, he was elected into the National Academy of Design as an Associate member, and became a full Academician in 1994.

Forge's work are among collections at the Tate Gallery and other art museums.

In 1950 Forge married Sheila Deane and they had three daughters. The marriage was dissolved and he remarried in 1974 to Ruth Miller.
