= Henderson's =

British publishing company

Coordinates: 51.5123°N 0.1284°W

Henderson's, better known as The Bomb Shop, was a bookshop at 66 Charing Cross Road, London known for publishing and selling both radical left and anarchist writing and modernist literature. The shop was founded in 1909, and was a father and son operation run by Francis Riddell Henderson, formerly the London representative of Walter Scott Publishing. The shop was bought by Eva Collet Reckitt, and became the first of the Collet's chain of left-wing bookshops.

== Shop ==
Few records exist of Francis Henderson's early life, but he had connections with Russian émigrés and developed a passion for Russian literature, especially the works of Tolstoy. This drew him into the circle of Vladimir Chertkov, a prominent Tolstoyan and a pacifist anarchist, and from there into London's radical scene. Henderson demanded that Walter Scott publish Louise Maude's translation of the Tolstoy novel Resurrection in the public domain with the legend "no rights reserved" – when Walter Scott refused, Henderson left to start his own printing press which developed into a bookshop for radical writing.

The advertising potential of the shop's nickname was quickly recognised, and both adverts and imprints proudly bear the text 'The Bomb Shop'. This boldness extended to the shop itself, which was painted in a red and gold Arts and Crafts style by Walter Crane and prominently featured the names of past rebels – a target for vandals politically opposed to the Bomb Shop, who would repaint it in blue and white and sometimes break in and destroy the interior. There were many rooms above Henderson's, and these proved to be excellent hiding places for fugitives. The suffragist Hugh Franklin hid out at Henderson's for two months after setting fire to a railway carriage in protest for women's suffrage.

The shop also proved to be radical in its acceptance of technology. The first Penguincubator, an early book vending machine developed by Allen Lane of Penguin Books, was installed at the shop.

== Publications ==
Russian Ballet by David Bomberg was published by Henderson's.

Henderson's publishing press began when Francis Henderson took over the Brotherhood Publishing Company (an organisation run by the Brotherhood Church). In Henderson's hands, the Brotherhood's profits and donations became a source of income to fund his own imprints. Henderson claimed his press ran at significant losses due to his copyright-waiver, but his refusal to pay authors their royalties or to repay the Maudes' loans to the press caused significant trouble in the Tolstoyan community and fed the growing schism surrounding Chertkov. Henderson eventually lost the rights to Maude's translation of Resurrection, and Chertkov took greater control over Tolstoyan publishing.

Self-publishing through Henderson's provided an outlet for suppressed voices and for many respected writers who were unable to publish their more radical writing through their usual channels. Authors published by Henderson's include Miles Malleson, who wrote Cranks and Commonsense in defence of conscientious objection as well as Two Short Plays: Patriotic and Unpatriotic, which was later confiscated by the police in a raid in 1916; Osbert Sitwell, whose first poetry collection The Winstonburg Line was submitted to Henderson's by Siegfried Sassoon; Louis Golding and Louis Esson.

Outside the world of politics, Henderson's also contributed to the then-burgeoning modernist movement through publishing the periodical Coterie, a quarterly journal of poetry, prose, literary criticism and art from authors and artists including T. S. Eliot, Aldous Huxley, Amy Lowell, Richard Aldington, Douglas Goldring, Edward Wadsworth, William Roberts, Henri Gaudier-Brzeska, André Derain, Amedeo Modigliani, Nina Hamnett, and Moïse Kisling, as well as publishing Thomas Moult's Voices anthologies. Russian Ballet by David Bomberg, the only surviving Vorticist book, was published by Henderson's after Bomberg and his wife were expelled from a performance of Ballets Russes for attempting to sell a self-published edition.

Henderson's had close ties to the publisher Victor Gollancz, under whom the Repton school newspaper A Public School Looks at the World (generally known as Pubbers) was co-published by and sold at Henderson's – an act that cost Gollancz his job. Gollancz went on to be founder of the left-leaning publishing house Victor Gollancz Ltd, and later described Henderson's book selection thus:

They must be rebel. Rebel a thousand years ago, rebel yesterday, rebel since lunch: not yet rebel at all, but likely to be rebel next week: rebel in politics, rebel in sex, rebel in religion – anything anyhow or anywhere rebel, anything smelling or tasting of rebel (even if a bit anachronistically) at once qualified for inclusion.
