= Frances Bardsley Academy for Girls =

Coordinates: 51.5732°N 0.1987°E

Location
- Brentwood Road; Romford, London Borough of Havering, RM1 2RR; England

Information
- Type: Academy
- Motto: Gladly Lerne, Gladly Teche
- Established: 1906
- Founder: Frances Bardsley
- Department for Education URN: 138326 Tables
- Ofsted: Reports
- Chair: The Revd Father R S P Hingley
- Headteacher: Julian Dutnall
- Gender: Girls
- Age: 11 to 18
- Enrollment: 1,408 (2024)
- Website: Frances Bardsley Academy

Frances Bardsley Academy for Girls is a non-denominational girls school and sixth form centre in the London Borough of Havering, England. The school educates girls between the ages of 11 and 18 (school years 7 to 13).

== Overview ==
The school is located on Brentwood Road, Romford. In 2024 the school had 1,408 pupils on its roll. The majority of pupils have white UK backgrounds though there has been a steady increase in girls from other ethnic and cultural backgrounds including African-Caribbean and those from the Indian subcontinent.

The student body represents girls from many different council estates. Just over 7% of pupils claim free school meals which is below the national average. Until 2003 the school was based on two separate sites; the Upper School (school years 9–13) at the existing site in Brentwood Road (built in 1910) and the Lower School (school years 7 and 8) at a separate site in Heath Park Road (built in 1906 and recognised by the Essex Education authority in 1909 when a commemorative stone was placed in the wall at the front of the school). These two sites were around a quarter of a mile from one another, and joined by a long road which is Catherine Road at the Lower School end and Lawrence Road at the Upper School end. Girls from the Upper School often attended lessons on the Lower School site. GCSE and AS/A Level Art and Design were two of the subjects which girls frequently had to travel between the two sites for. It was considered that this was a less than desirable situation.

It was this less than desirable situation which meant that in 2003 the Lower School Site was sold and developed into houses and flats. The main school building was converted into 12 apartments and 2 duplex galleried houses and renamed 'Academy Square'. As it is a grade II Listed Building it could not be knocked down. This project was not completed entirely until 2006 and went on to win the Built-In Quality Award from the London District Surveyors Association. This part of the work was done by Cove Architects who specialise in "Built-In" architecture (i.e. when a building which already exists is converted into something else).

The other buildings, including the gym, "B-Block" (a prefabricated building dating from the late 1980s) and "wing" (a supposedly temporary structure dating from the 1940s and consisting of a science laboratory and three classrooms) were demolished, and houses built on them. This estate is now known as 'Academy Fields'.

== History ==
Previous to the school becoming The Frances Bardsley School for Girls in 1972, the two sites had housed "sister" schools; a Secondary modern school and a Grammar school.

The first school was started, in 1906, by the founder Frances Bardsley in the centre of Romford; her vision was to provide free education for local girls. So established did the school become that it moved into large new premises on the northern outskirts of Romford (the modern day site on Brentwood Road). In the 1930s, as a result of educational policy the school became a selective Grammar school, and was renamed the Romford County High School for Girls.

At this time the old Lower School site on Heath Park Road (now Academy Fields) was the Secondary Modern school known as The Heath Park Secondary Modern School for Girls.

After the reforming implementation of Comprehensive schools during the 1970s The Romford County High School for Girls and The Heath Park Secondary Modern School for Girls amalgamated to become what we now know as The Frances Bardsley School for Girls, and the Lower School/Upper School dynamic that was in place until 2003, was established.

The school gained Specialist school status in the Visual arts in July 2004, and then converted to academy status on 1 July 2012.

== Head Teachers ==
The current headmaster (from September 2011) is Julian Dutnall. The previous headteacher was Suzanne Philipps. She held the post from 2001 to 2011. Previous to her taking over the role the Headmistress was Pamela Joughin. The headmistress during the 1980s was Mrs Irwin-Hunt. Miss Mullholland was the headmistress from 1969 after Dorothy Bubbers retired.

== Absence rates ==
The school has a 7% authorised absence rate and 0.5% unauthorised absence rate. This compares favorably to the 7% national authorised absence rate and 1.2% unauthorised absence rate in the UK.

== GCSE results ==
The last published available information is from 2004, when 73% of pupils in Year 11 achieved 5 or more A*-C GCSEs. This was up on the previous year when 70% of pupils in Year 11 achieved 5 or more A*-C GCSEs.

== Ofsted results ==
The last Ofsted (Office for Standards in Education) inspection took place on 19-20 November 2024 (inspection number 138326). Robert Grice led the investigation, assisted by a team of five other inspectors.

The full report, as well as previous reports, can be read on Office for Standards in Education website.

== Notable former pupils ==
- Edna Mann, painter and co-founder of the Borough Group of artists.
- Paula Jennings from New Tricks and EastEnders attended the school until 1992.
- Natalie Steward, winner of the Bronze medal for 100m freestyle at the 1960 Olympics, attended the school in the 1950s.
- Gemma Collins, media personality and businesswoman, attended the school from 1992 to 1996.
- Rochelle Wiseman from The Saturdays.

== See also ==
- Frances Bardsley International
