= Barking College =

Barking College may refer to:

- Barking and Dagenham College, a current further education college
- Barking Regional College of Technology, a predecessor to the present University of East London
