= Dorothy Mead =

British painter (1928–1975)

- Born: Dorothy Irene Mead; 25 April 1928; London, UK
- Died: 12 June 1975 (aged 47); Clacton-on-Sea, Essex, UK
- Education: Dagenham School of Art; City Literary Institute; Borough Polytechnic; Slade School of Fine Art, 1959
- Occupations: Painter; lecturer

Dorothy Irene Mead (25 April 1928 – 12 June 1975) was a British painter, lecturer and member of the London Group of artists.

== Early life and education ==
Mead was born on 25 April 1928 in London and adopted at three months old by a family in Walthamstow. Her mother had a florist shop.

She first met David Bomberg when he was teaching at the Dagenham School of Art in 1944. She followed him when he moved to the City Literary Institute in London and then to the Borough Polytechnic where she studied under Bomberg from 1945 to 1951. Mead was a founder member of the Borough Group in 1946 together with other pupils of Bomberg including Cliff Holden.

From 1956 until 1959, Mead was a mature student at the Slade School of Fine Art. Here she met the artist and teacher Andrew Forge. She had a major influence on students such as Patrick Procktor and Mario Dubsky and was the first woman president of the student annual exhibiting society, Young Contemporaries (later renamed New Contemporaries) in 1959. The previous year, the Slade awarded her the Figure Painting Prize, and the Steer Prize. In 1959 she was asked to leave the Slade, in spite of her award-winning work, because she refused to sit the course on perspective. She believed - with Bomberg - that the stylistic approach was invalid. Her thesis, explaining her view was not accepted by the principal, William Coldstream.

== Career ==
In the Arts Council England series of touring exhibitions, Six Young Painters, Mead exhibited in 1964 with other artists including Peter Blake, William Crozier, David Hockney, Bridget Riley and Euan Uglow. Mead joined the London Group of artists in 1960. The New Statesman singled her out, when critic David Sylvester remarked she "tends to affirm the supremacy of light, as women's painting often does." Holden, her partner said "Dorothy sticks to her principals, but like myself and Bomberg was an outsider".

In 1964, Mead arrived as a lecturer at Goldsmiths College "like a breath of fresh air" according to pupil and painter Barry Martin. She swept aside the old gentlemanly bohemian and class pretensions that she thought "stubborn preconceptions". Her family saw her "living on the edge" of reality all the time. She worked in a garret studio in Ladbroke Grove, yet went up to Berkeley Square to buy paints. She was described by Dennis Creffield, artist and fellow student of Bomberg, as having an "abundant personality...a great love of art...stylish in appearance." Her daring, precarious act of existential expressionism can be seen in The Acrobat, an exhibition of 1970 at Borough Road Gallery.

Mead was President of the London Group from 1971 to 1973, succeeding Andrew Forge, a progressive art historian with whom she was long associated, and also had an affair with. Mead spent two spells teaching at Morley College: between 1963 and 1965 she taught 'Painting', and from 1973 to 1975 she taught 'Drawing & Painting' ("for advanced students of some considerable experience") and 'Improvisation from the Model' in the Morley Summer Painting School. Mead was also a part-time lecturer at Chelsea College of Art in London between 1962 and 1964. She was a feminist with a principled individualism - she once remarked that if she changed her name to George, she stood a greater chance of selling her work!

== Exhibitions and works in museum collections ==
The collection of the Tate Gallery and other art museums include work by Mead. Mead's paintings were shown at the 1991 exhibition Bomberg and his Legacy, held in Eastbourne at the Towner Art Gallery.

In 2005, a retrospective exhibition was held thirty years after her death. Despite the esteem she had earned from fellow artists, it was her first ever solo exhibition.

Shortly following her early death on 12 June 1975, it has been claimed that some of Mead's paintings were stolen from a warehouse in Essex, although this is disputed and no evidence to substantiate this has ever been published over the decades.

UK Government probate records establish that Mead died without a will. Valerie Long, one of Mead's sisters is the holder of some of Mead's works and is represented by Waterhouse & Dodd for sales and disposals. Other paintings are held in another family member's estate as well as amongst private collectors.

A number of her works are held in the Sarah Rose Collection at London South Bank University and an exhibition of her works alongside those of Edna Mann took place at the Borough Road Gallery there in early 2024.

== A list of works ==
- Portrait of Dinora Mendelson Oil on board (1947)
- Looking South Oil on Canvas (1947)
- Menton Harbour Oil on board (1947)
- Looking into the distance Oil on canvas (1947-8)
- Self portrait Oil on board (1953)
- Landscape Oil on board (Circa 1955)
- Self portrait Oil on canvas (Circa 1955)
- Nude study Charcoal on paper (1956)
- Rooftops Oil on board (1956)
- Cityscape Oil on canvas (1956)
- Landscape Charcoal on paper (1957)
- Portrait study Charcoal on paper (1957)
- Still life with flowers Charcoal on paper (1957)
- Self portrait study Charcoal on paper (1958)
- Still life Oil on canvas (1958)
- Still life Charcoal on paper (1959)
- Still life with flowers Charcoal on paper (1959)
- Life Room Oil on board (1959)
- Nude study Charcoal on paper (Oct 1959)
- Reclining with figure Oil on board (1961)
- Seated figure Oil on canvas (1962)
- Afternoon Oil on board (1962)
- Seascape (Holland-on-Sea) Oil on canvas (1966)
- The taking of Christ I Oil on canvas (1966)
- The Temptation (after Michelangelo) Oil on canvas (1966)
- Wheat fields Oil on canvas (1966)
- The taking of Christ II Oil on canvas (1967)
- Arcade Oil on canvas (1967)
- Blue nude Oil on canvas (Circa 1968)
- Overlooking London Oil on canvas (1969)
- Abstract composition Oil on canvas (1969)
- Pieta (after Van Gogh) Oil on canvas (1971)
- Woman in chair Oil on canvas (Circa 1972)
- Life class study Etching (ed.20) (Circa 1973)

Work	Repository
Light on the sea	Government Art Collection
Still life with Aubergine	Government Art Collection
Standing figure	UCL Art Museum
Study after the Antique	UCL Art museum
Still life with Green Pepper	UCL Art museum
Flowers	Arts Council Collection
Portrait - Oil on Canvas, 1962	The Sarah Rose Collection, London South Bank University
Vase of Flowers	London South Bank Collection
Vase of Flowers [2]	London South Bank Collection
Figure Composition after Goya	London South Bank Collection
Self-portrait	London South Bank Collection
Standing Female Figure	London South Bank Collection
Meeting	London South Bank Collection
Two Figures	London South Bank Collection
Model Resting	London South Bank Collection
Self Portrait	London South Bank Collection
Hands	London South Bank Collection
Reclining Nude	London South Bank Collection
Reclining Nude [2]	London South Bank Collection
Landscape	London South Bank Collection
Acrobat	London South Bank Collection
Transvestite	London South Bank Collection
Chessboard - Oil on Canvas, 1958	Tate
Industrial Landscape, Evening	British Academy
Seascape, Brighton	British Academy
Tombs - Oil on board, 1947	British Academy
The Pianist II	British Academy
Reclining Figure	Sarah Rose Collection, London South Bank University.
