= South Bank Technopark =

Coordinates: 51.4968°N 0.1019°W

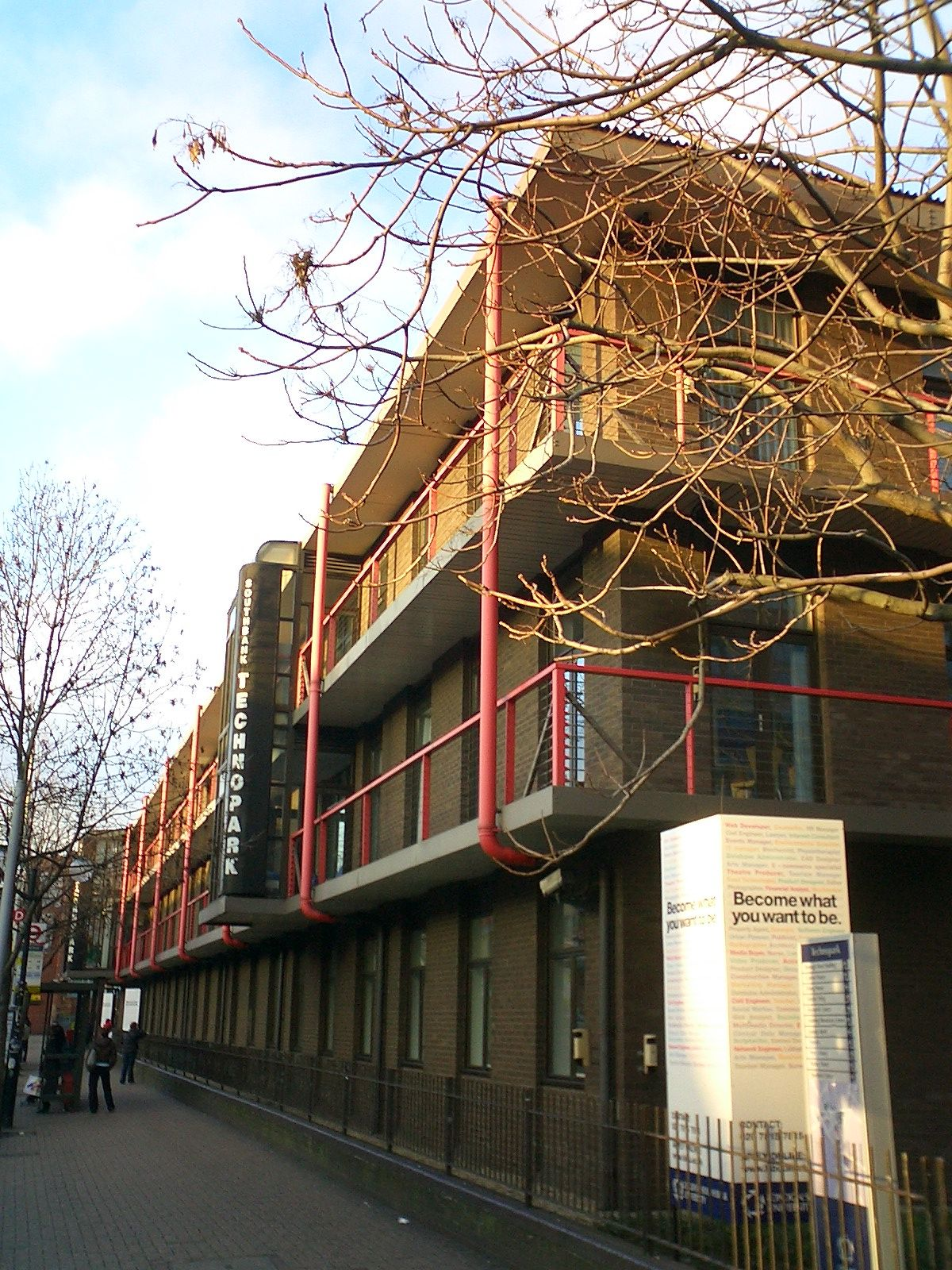
The South Bank Technopark building.

South Bank Technopark at London South Bank University, England, houses the main administration for the university, including the Vice-Chancellor's Office, under the leadership of Prof. David Phoenix.

The Technopark building was opened in November 1985. Hugh West became its CEO in 1988. It is designed in a modular way, with a floor area of 3,000 m^{2}, which can be divided into units from around 19 m^{2} in size. As well as university offices, there are also a number of small companies that rent space in the building. The Technopark currently houses 37 high-tech businesses.

Technopark is located in London Road just north of the Elephant and Castle on the east side of the road. The Elephant and Castle tube station is very close to the building.

== London Knowledge Innovation Centre ==
In 2006, the University opened a business incubator at South Bank Technopark called London Knowledge Innovation Centre (LKIC), with serviced office space, business advice, virtual incubation, hot desk rental and strategic mentoring. LKIC was launched by the well-known inventor Trevor Baylis OBE and has built up a client base of early-stage knowledge-based businesses.

== See also ==
- List of science parks in the United Kingdom
