= Lilian Holt =

British painter (1898–1983)

- David Bomberg (1929) Lilian Painting David (Painting Lilian), Tate Gallery.
- Born: 26 July 1898; Putney, Wandsworth, London, England
- Died: 13 May 1983 (aged 84); London, England
- Education: Putney Art School; Regent Street Polytechnic
- Occupation: Painter
- Notable work: Tajo, Ronda (1956)
- Movement: Borough Group
- Spouse(s): Jacob Mendelson (m. 1923; div. 1928) David Bomberg (m. 1941; died 1957)
- Partner: David Bomberg (1928–1941)
- Children: 2
- Relatives: Leslie Marr (ex-son-in-law)

Lilian Thirza Charlotte Holt (married name Bomberg; formerly Mendelson; 26 July 1898 – 13 May 1983) was a British painter and founding member of the Borough Group. Holt's dedication to her partner and family limited her career and opportunities as an artist.

== Early life and education ==
Holt was born on 26 July 1898 in Putney, Wandsworth to Oliver Oswald Holt, a civil servant, and Kate Holt (died 1905). The youngest of four siblings, Holt's brother Jack died whilst serving in the First World War.

During 1913 to 1914, Holt attended Putney Art School for a team, before studying at Clark's College with a view of entering the civil service. Holt later worked at the Post Office before serving in the Women's Land Army. Following the end of the First World War, Holt worked for Prudential. In 1922, Holt studied at Regent Street Polytechnic.

== Career ==
In 1924 (Note: Also cited as 1923.), Holt married Jacob Mendelson and subsequently gave birth to their daughter, the painter Dinora Mendelson. Mendelson reportedly forbade Holt to paint however, she was able to handle and study the work of Walter Sickert, Jacob Epstein, Jacob Kramer and David Bomberg during this period. In 1928, Holt began her relationship with Bomberg.

Holt did not resume painting until 1945, focusing instead on supporting Bomberg's career. While Bomberg was teaching at the Borough Polytechnic Institute, Holt was a founding member of the Borough Group, a collective of painters influenced by Bomberg, and participated in group exhibitions. Holt and Bomberg moved to Ronda in Spain from 1954 to 1957, before returning to England due to Bomberg's failing health. After his death, Holt focused on her own work, travelling to, often remote areas of, Mexico, Basutoland, Andalusia, Yugoslavia, Morocco, Turkey, and Iceland to paint, as well as continuing to promote Bomberg's legacy.

== Exhibitions and collections ==
Tajo, Ronda (1956), oil paint on canvas, Tate Gallery.

Exhibitions of Holt's work include Paintings and Drawings by David Bomberg (1890-1957) and Lilian Holt (1971) at the Reading Museum and Art Gallery and her first solo exhibition, Lilian Holt: Paintings and Drawings (1980) at the Ben Uri Gallery, when she was in her seventies. Posthumous exhibitions include the 1992 group exhibition Ten Decades: Careers of Ten Women Artists Born 1897-1906 at the Norwich Gallery and the 1985 solo exhibition A Tribute to Lilian Bomberg at Fischer Fine Art in London. In 2023 her work was included in the exhibition Action, Gesture, Paint: Women Artists and Global Abstraction 1940-1970 at the Whitechapel Gallery in London.

Holt's painting Tajo, Ronda (1956) is in the permanent collection of the Tate Gallery. She is also the subject of several paintings by Bomberg, including Lilian (1932) and Lilian Painting David (Painting Lilian) (1929).

== Personal life ==
In 1924, Holt married Jacob Mendelson (1891–1972), an art and antique dealer of Russian descent. (Note: Mendelson is cited as being born in the Russian Empire. and London.) The couple later separated before later divorcing in 1928. Mendelson and Holt had one daughter, the painter Dinora Mendelson (1924–2009) through whom she was the mother-in-law of Leslie Marr during 1948 to 1956, and later the actor Bernard Davies-Rees.

In 1941, Holt married the painter David Bomberg with whom she had one daughter, Diana (1935–1974).

On 13 May 1983, Holt died in London aged 84.
