= London Road, Southwark =

Road in London, England

Coordinates: 51.49800°N 0.10394°W

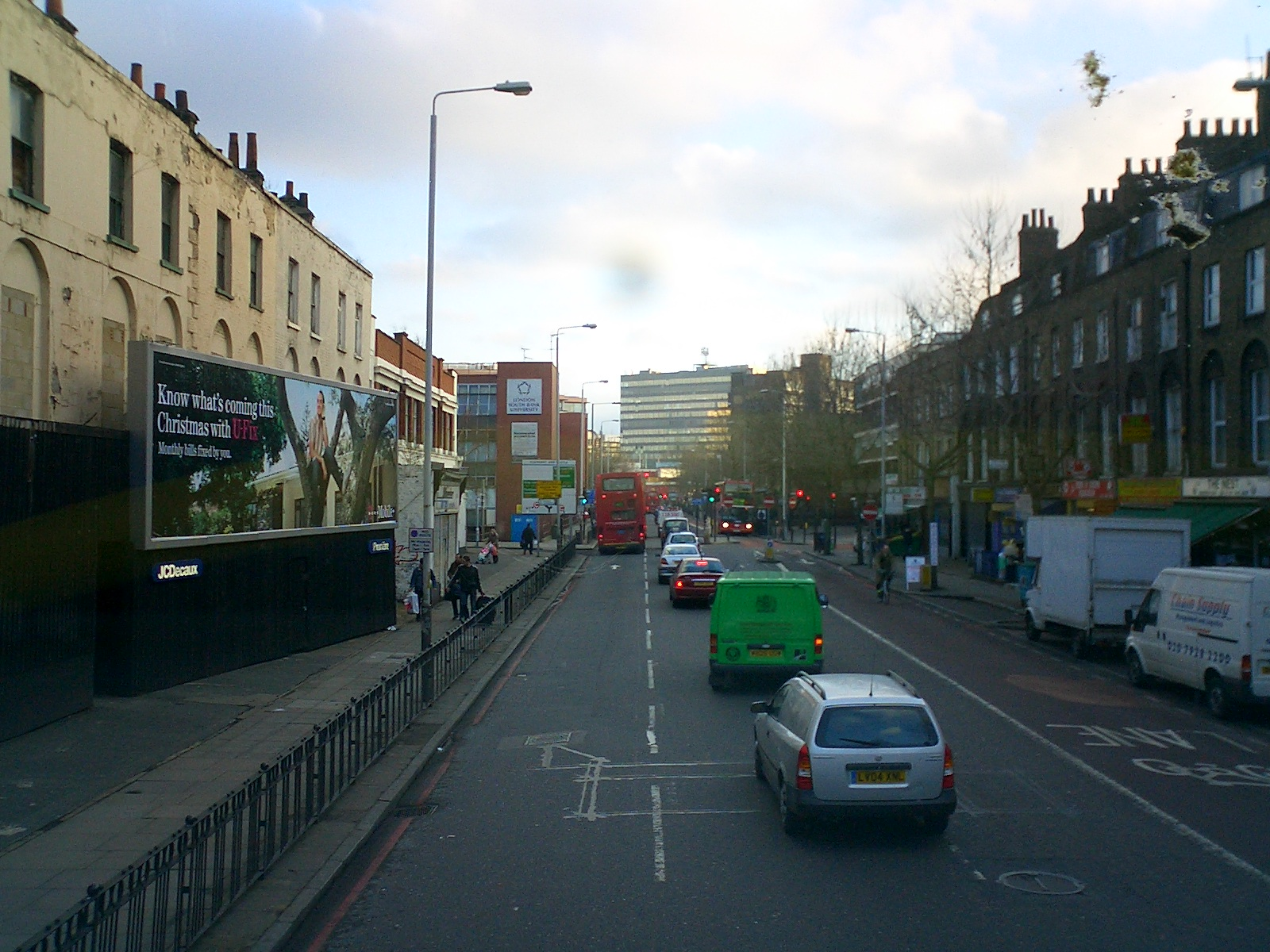
Looking southeast along London Road.

London Road is a short road in Southwark, Central London, England, which connects St George's Circus (northwest) and the Elephant and Castle roundabout (southeast). To the east is the campus of London South Bank University including the Technopark building and the London Road Building, in a triangle formed by London Road, Borough Road and Newington Causeway. At the southeastern end is the Elephant and Castle tube station.

The road forms part of the A201 and is one-way for most traffic (flowing southeast), with a buses and cycles only lane heading in the opposite direction. To the southeast, the A201 continues as the New Kent Road and to the north is Blackfriars Road leading to the Thames at Blackfriars Bridge and thence the City of London.

There are a number of shops at the northwestern end of the road.

== Gallery ==
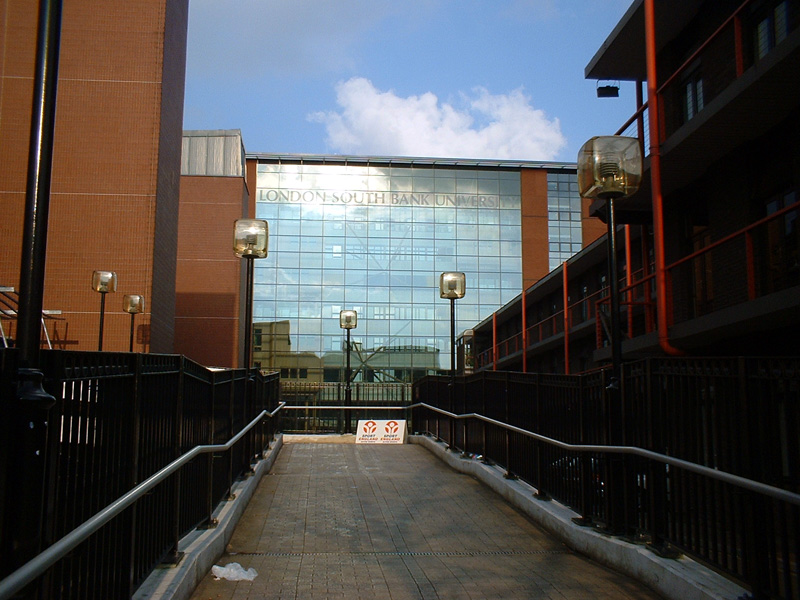
A view of London South Bank University from London Road. To the left is the London Road building, ahead is the Keyworth Centre and to the right is the Technopark building.

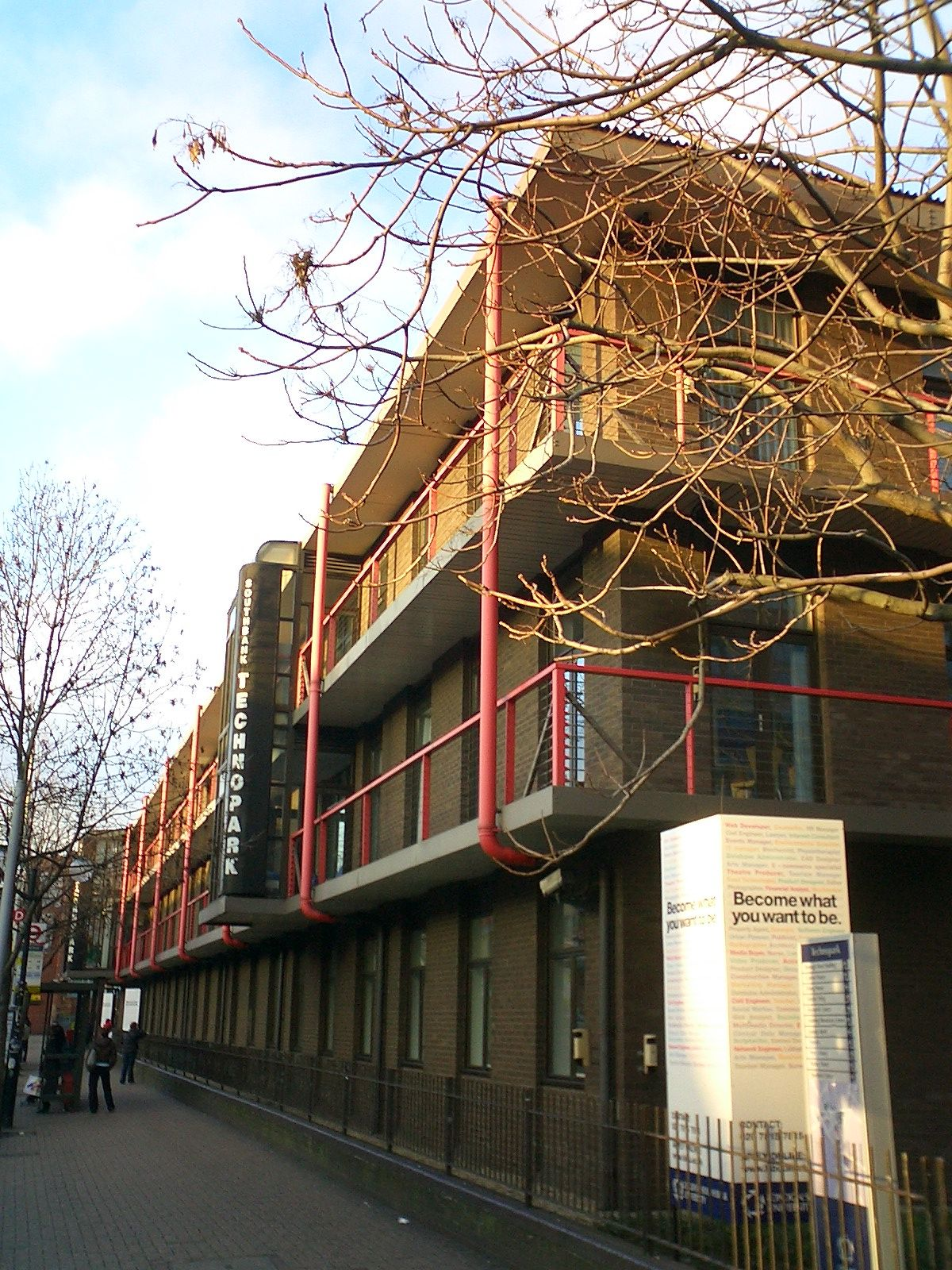
The South Bank Technopark building on London Road.

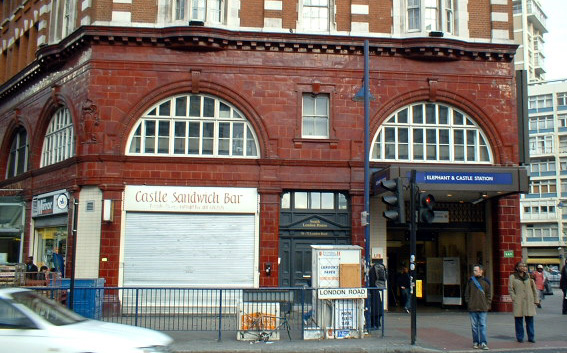
The Elephant and Castle tube station at the southeast end of London Road.
