= N. M. H. Lightfoot =

British mathematician and academic administrator

Nicholas Morpeth Hutchinson Lightfoot FRSE (1902–1962) was a British mathematician and academic administrator. He was an expert on heat conduction.

== Life ==
He was born in Jarrow in north-east England on 14 October 1902, the son of Thomas Lightfoot. He was educated locally, but excelled, winning a place at Cambridge University where he graduated BA in 1923 and continued as a postgraduate, gaining a further MA.

In 1929 he began lecturing in mathematics at Heriot-Watt College in Edinburgh. In 1931 he was elected a Fellow of the Royal Society of Edinburgh. His proposers were Sir Edmund Taylor Whittaker, James Cameron Smail, Sir Charles Galton Darwin, and Edward Thomas Copson.

In 1943 he moved to the south of England to take on the role of Principal of South East Essex Technical College. In 1950 he moved to head Chelsea Polytechnic. He served as President of the Association of Technical Institutions 1955–6.

He died in London on 14 November 1962.

== Family ==
In 1929 he married Janet Moulton (d.1961).

== Publications ==
- The Solidification of Molten Steel (1929)
