= Jacob Mendelson =

British art dealer

Jacob Mendelson (1891–1972) was a British art and antique dealer of Russian descent.

Mendelson had stores in London's Tottenham Court Road and King's Road.

From 1923 to 1928, he was married to the British artist Lilian Holt, who later married the painter David Bomberg. They had one child, the artist Dinora Mendelson (1924–2010), who married the artist Leslie Marr.
