= Cliff Holden =

British painter (1919–2020)

Cliff Holden FCSD (12 December 1919 – 20 April 2020) was a British painter, designer, and silk-screen printer.

Holden was born in Manchester, England in December 1919 and educated at Wilmslow Modern School, followed by Reaseheath School of Agriculture, where he studied agriculture and veterinary science.

In 1944, Holden met David Bomberg (1890–1957) at the City Literary Institute in London.

In 1945, Holden followed Bomberg to Borough Polytechnic.

There Holden founded the Borough Group in 1946 together with other pupils of Bomberg.

The purpose of the group was to develop the ideas of Bomberg who taught at Borough Polytechnic during the 1940s and 1950s, and was the leading light of the movement.

Holden was first president of the group during 1946–48, as suggested by Bomberg, after which Bomberg became president and the group extended to 11 members, among them Dennis Creffield. The group was active until 1951.

Holden met the Swedish artist Torsten Renquist and Renquist invited him to exhibit in Sweden. From 1956, he lived in Sweden and his artworks are also in collections there.

Holden was a member of the London Group. He was a Fellow of the Chartered Society of Designers and the Free Painters and Sculptors. He was also a design associate of the American Institute of Interior Designers. He received an honorary doctorate from London South Bank University in 2006.

The collections of the Arts Council, Manchester City Art Gallery, Scottish National Gallery of Modern Art, Tate Britain, Victoria and Albert Museum include work by Holden.

He died in April 2020 at the age of 100.

== See also ==
Further members of the Borough Group at Borough Polytechnic:

- Edna Mann
- Dorothy Mead
- Dennis Creffield
- Peter Richmond
