= Miles Richmond =

English painter

Miles Peter Richmond (19 December 1922 – 7 October 2008) was a British artist.

== Biography ==
Born Peter Richmond, in Isleworth, Middlesex, he added the name Miles in the 1980s, and became generally known as such. From 1940 to 1943 he attended Kingston School of Art, and then, as a conscientious objector during World War Two, he worked on the land. This caused a rift with his father, an Admiralty engineer, and was thought by his intimates to account, at least in part, for the palpable emotional depth and passion of his paintings.

In 1946, he began training at the Borough Polytechnic in Southwark (now London South Bank University), under David Bomberg, and in the same year he became a founder member of the influential Borough Group of artists. Fellow members included the Group's founding president, Cliff Holden, Dorothy Mead and Dennis Creffield. In 1952, he and his first wife, Eleanor (later Susanna) Richmond moved to Aix-en-Provence, France, and in 1954 he followed David Bomberg to Ronda, Andalusia, Spain. He lived and worked there for over twenty years.

Richmond returned to the Britain in 1979, residing for a time in Camden Town, London, where he painted his breakthrough work, 'The Red Studio'. According to the artist, he worked on the painting non-stop for three days, during which time he experienced a quasi-mystical experience when he seemed to travel through the sun; as he emerged, he heard a voice saying, "Now you are connected."

At various times he taught art at Portsmouth Polytechnic and Morley College in London, where his students included Tatiana Litvinov, daughter of Joseph Stalin's one-time Foreign Minister. Other students included Nigel Caple (whom Richmond met at Portsmouth Polytechnic, and where Richmond came into severe conflict with Marxists who were then dominant in the art department) and Rosie Skaife d'Ingerthorpe, who had graduated from Goldsmiths College. He later moved near the town of Richmond in North Yorkshire, where he painted, exhibited and continued to teach. Students came to train with him on study leave, especially from St Albans College of Art, later part of Hertfordshire University. In 1992 he was invited to paint a 36-foot-wide mural to celebrate the centenary of Borough Polytechnic. When unveiled in 1999 it would be described by another former Bomberg pupil, Frank Auerbach, as 'a brave and ambitious enterprise;' the art historian Richard Cork would call it a 'millennial tour de force'.

In 1994, he moved to Middlesbrough with his second wife Miranda, where he painted until his death. His final exhibition of paintings opened on 7 November 2008 at the Boundary Gallery in north London; it included a room of his early works and a room of his last paintings. His estate is represented by the Mayfair dealer, David Messum Fine Art.

Richmond had a strong spiritual sense, regarding painting as similar to prayer, and nurtured a lifelong determination never to become what he called a "dealer's artist". A month before his death he published a letter in The Guardian very critical of a materialistic ethos in contemporary western art, provoked by the auction at Sotheby's of work by Damien Hirst. According to his obituary in The Guardian, published the following month, 'He carried with him to the grave the reputation of remaining a follower of Bomberg, and for the promoters of fashion and fortune in art there is no future in being behind. That is the modern heresy, but without fame or fortune Miles Richmond's work rises above it.'
