= Dennis Creffield =

British artist (1931–2018)

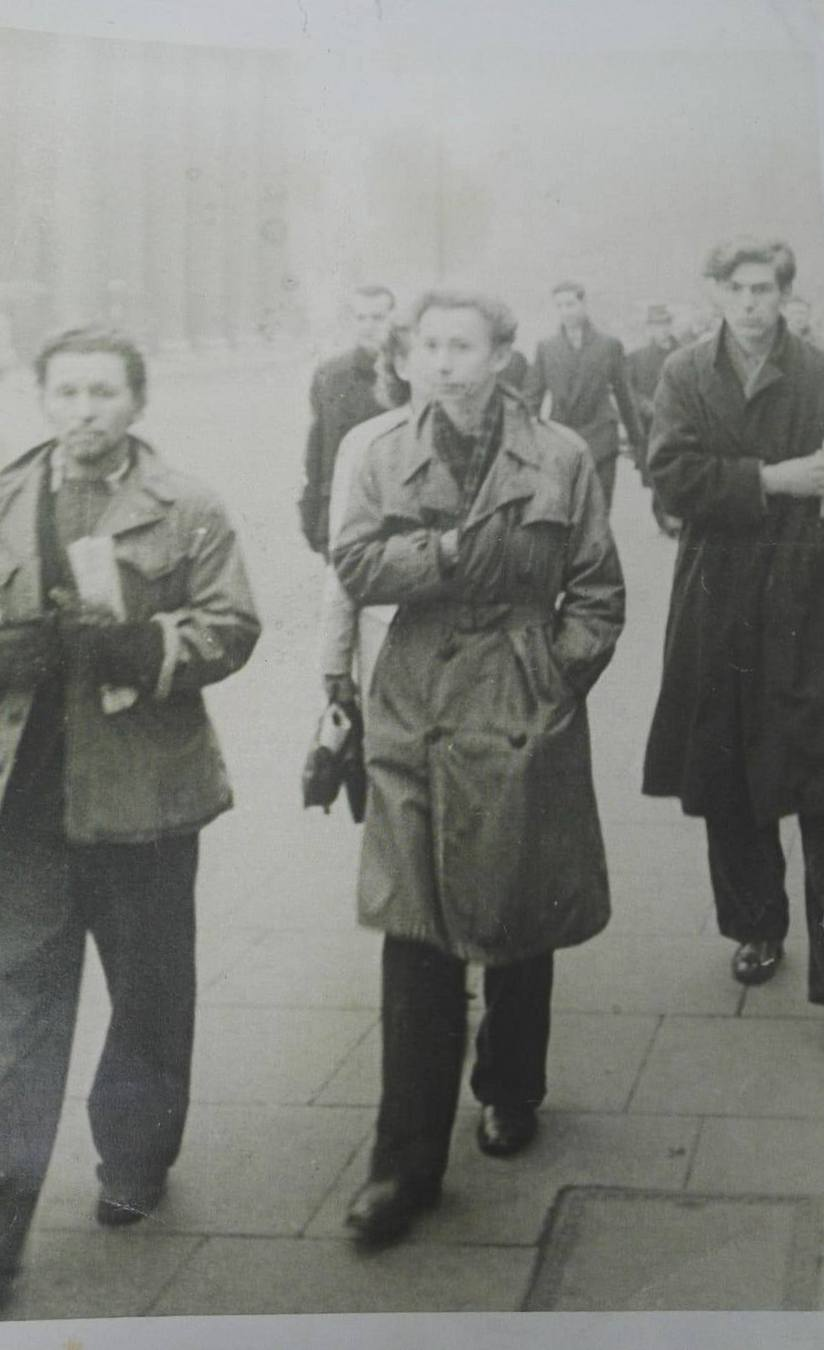
- Photograph of Dennis Creffield (middle), taken in Stockholm, 1952.
- Born: Dennis Richard Creffield; 29 January 1931; London, England
- Died: 26 June 2018 (aged 87); Brighton, England
- Known for: painting, drawing, teaching
- Website: https://denniscreffield.org/

Dennis Creffield (29 January 1931 – 26 June 2018) was a British artist with work owned by major British and worldwide art collections, including the Tate Gallery, The British Museum, Arts Council of England, the Government Art Collection, The Los Angeles County Museum of Art, Leeds City Art Gallery, University of Leeds collection, Williams College Museum of Art, University of Brighton collection, Swindon Art Gallery collection and others.

He died at the age of 87, and was buried in the Bear Road (City) Cemetery in Brighton.

== Early life and education ==
Creffield was born in London, and studied at the Borough Polytechnic under David Bomberg from 1948 to 1951, during which time he exhibited as a member of the Borough Group, which included Bomberg and fellow students Cliff Holden, Dorothy Mead, Miles Peter Richmond and Leslie Marr. He later studied at the Slade School of Art, part of the University of London from 1957 to 1961, where he won the Tonks Prize for Life Drawing and the Steer Medal for Landscape Painting. In 1961 he was first prizewinner in the John Moores Prize Exhibition, at the Walker Art Gallery in Liverpool. In the same year he showed work in an Arts Council of Great Britain national touring exhibition, Six Young Painters. Then, in 1964, he was recommended to the University of Leeds by the eminent art theorist Herbert Read to become the Gregory Fellow in Art, a post he held from 1964 to 1966. It was whilst a Gregory Fellow that Creffield began teaching, both at the University of Leeds and Leeds College of Art, and he was subsequently to teach at various art colleges in Britain and abroad, including the University of Brighton, University for the Creative Arts and the Cyprus College of Art.

== Work and commissions ==
In 1985, Creffield was commissioned by the Arts Council to draw every cathedral in England, a task undertaken by living in a camper van for two years. This resulted in the exhibition 'English Cathedrals' at the Hayward Gallery, London, which subsequently toured Britain (1988–1990), and a related book written by Creffield. Six of these drawings, including 'Peterborough: Approaching the West Front' and several views of Canterbury Cathedral were acquired by the Tate Gallery in 1990. A very positive review by the distinguished writer on art, Peter Fuller, of a touring exhibition of Creffield's drawings of English cathedrals appeared in the first issue of the journal, Modern Painters (then edited by Fuller, its founder), together with an essay by Roy Oxlade on their teacher, David Bomberg.

After the cathedrals of England, further series of drawings were commissioned, including the cathedrals of northern France, shown at the Albemarle Gallery in London in 1991. In 2005, Flowers Gallery, London, staged a major retrospective exhibition and published a catalogue including a foreword by novelist Howard Jacobson and a conversation between Dennis & Professor Lynda Morris. Creffield's importance as a contemporary draughtsman was also recognised in 2008 when he was included in the exhibition 'Drawn from the Collection, 400 Years of British Drawing' at Tate Britain. In 2011 he staged a major exhibition entitled ‘Jerusalem’ at James Hyman Gallery, inspired by the city and by William Blake's great poem. A great critical and commercial success, Creffield considered the show to be the climax of his career

Creffield's work was greatly admired by fellow artists and writers such as R. B. Kitaj, Peter Redgrove, Edward Lucie-Smith, Henri Cartier-Bresson, Regina Derieva, Howard Jacobson and Peter Ackroyd.

He was represented for many years by James Hyman Gallery in London and his estate is now represented by Waterhouse & Dodd in London.

== See also ==
- Borough Group

=== Films ===
- Looking into Paintings – Dennis Creffield, 'Narrative' episode of the Malachite TV series. Dir. Norbert Lynton, Channel 4, 1985.
- The Invisible Recorder – Dennis Creffield's East Anglian Cathedrals. Dir. Charles Mapleston, Anglia Television, 1989.
- Summer Painting. Dennis Creffield at Salisbury Cathedral. Dir. Carolyn Djanogly, Meridian Films, 1996.

=== Selected bibliography ===
- Fyra engelsmän/Four English Painters, exh. cat., with text by Torsten Renqvist, Gummesons konstgalleri, Stockholm, 1952
- Spalding, F. & Collins, J., Dictionary of British Art, Volume 6: 20th Century Painters and Sculptors, Antique Collectors’ Club Ltd., London, 1977
- Kate Aspinall, ‘Artist Versus Teacher: The Problem of David Bomberg's Pedagogical Legacy’, Tate Papers, no. 33, 2020, accessed 18 December 2020.
- Richard Cork, David Bomberg, Yale University Press, New Haven and London, 1987
- English Cathedrals: Drawings by Dennis Creffield, exh. cat., with foreword by R.B. Kitaj and texts by Dennis Creffield, South Bank Centre Publications, London, 1987
- David Beckham, Artists in Britain Since 1945, Art Dictionaries, Ltd., London, 1988
- Midsummer Night's Dream: Drawings and Paintings by Dennis Creffield, exh. cat., with foreword by Philip Dodd. Goldmark, 1989
- "Portrait of the Artist /Interview with Dennis Creffield/", The Artist's & Illustrator's Magazine, Issue 42, March 1990
- Dan Hofstadt, "Dungeon Masters... ", The New Yorker, 12 November 1990
- French Cathedrals: Drawings by Dennis Creffield, exh. cat., with foreword by Richard Cork, Albemarle Gallery, London, 1991
- Peter Fuller, Modern Painters: Reflections on British Art, (edited by John McDonald), Methuen, London, 1993
- Robert Snell, "Faces in the slighted sediment", The Times Literary Supplement, 19 July 2002
- Impressions of Castles, Drawings of Welsh and English Castles, exh. cat., with introductory essay by Peter Wakelin & poem by Regina Derieva. Globegallery, Hay-on-Wye, Hereford, 2002
- Philip Vann, Face to Face: British Self-Portraits in the Twentieth Century. Sansom & Company, 2004
- Dennis Creffield: a retrospective, exh. cat., with foreword by Howard Jacobson and interview by Lynda Morris, Flowers East, London, 2005
- John Russell Taylor. "Back to the drawing board", The Times, 23 March 2005
- Dennis Creffield. Jerusalem, exh. cat., James Hyman Fine Art, London, 2011
- Andrew Lambirth, ‘England's most closely guarded secret’, The Spectator, 24 September 2011
- Neil Roberts, A Lucid Dreamer: The Life of Peter Redgrove, Random House, 2012
- Marina Vaizey, Figure to Ground: Five Figurative Artists: Frank Auerbach, Leon Kossoff, Dennis Creffield, John Virtue, Celia Paul, Cv Publications, 2012
- "Dennis Creffield", Wall Street International magazine, 21 February 2014
- Philip Dodd, "Tribute paid to Dennis Creffield", Antiques Trade Gazette, Issue 2350, 14 July 2018
- Rafael Pic, "Dennis Creffield, le peintre des cathédrales", Le Quotidien de l'Art, Édition N°1539, 16 July 2018
