= The Mud Bath =

Painting by David Bomberg

David Bomberg, The Mud Bath, 1914

The Mud Bath is a 1914 oil-on-canvas painting by David Bomberg. The work is considered a masterpiece of Bomberg's work in this period. Bomberg was a founder member of the London Group, and the painting is considered a leading example of Vorticism, although Bomberg resisted being described as a Vorticist.

The painting is a striking composition of human figures formed from white and blue geometric planes and angles, in a rectangular bath of vibrant red surrounded by a landscape of mustard brown, arranged around a brown and black vertical element (perhaps a column at the baths). There is a suggestion that the bathers are waving their arms as if in a Bacchanalian revel. The scene is based on Schewzik Russian Vapour Baths in Brick Lane, Whitechapel, near Bomberg's home in east London, which was used by the local Jewish population for cleanliness and for religious observances, including the mikveh ritual bath. Bomberg's Jewishness was a very important part of his identity as an artist. The bathing room, with a communal bath approximately 10-foot square and balcony above, was open to either men and women on different days, and may also have been the inspiration for his 1913 work, Ju-Jitsu.

Bomberg created a series of crayon, gouache and chalk studies before the painting. The completed work measures 152.4 centimetres (60.0 in) by 224.2 centimetres (88.3 in). It was a key component in his one-man exhibition the Chenil Gallery in Chelsea in 1914. In addition to taking first place in the catalogue, the work was hung on the wall outside the gallery so that it could have "every advantage of lighting and space". A critic remarked that the work was "rained upon, baked by the sun and garlanded with flags", but it did not entice many passing the gallery to enter. The London Chronicle noted that "The passers-by make no comment, because they do not recognise it as a picture". Bomberg recalled that as they turned the corner of King's Road, horses pulling the number 29 bus would shy at it.

The work was purchased by the Tate Gallery in 1964, seven years after Bomberg's death.
