= Chenil Gallery =

British art gallery

Coordinates: 51.4873°N 0.1688°W

The Chenil Gallery (often referred to as the Chenil Galleries, or New Chenil Galleries) was a British art gallery and sometime-music studio in Chelsea, London between 1905 and 1927, and later the location of various businesses referencing this early use.

== History ==
Located at 181–183 King's Road, the gallery was founded in 1905 by Jack Knewstub, who had previously been an administrator of the Chelsea School of Art. The gallery, with two exhibition rooms, shared its building with Charles Chenil & Co Ltd., a seller of art supplies and picture frames. In 1927, Knewstub declared bankruptcy and closed the gallery; the Chenil name continued to be used in association with various exhibitions until the 1950s.

During its lifetime, the gallery was one of group of galleries "favoured by the Camden Town Group artists", and was recognized for its exhibitions of British contemporary artists, including Augustus John, William Orpen, David Bomberg, Derwent Lees and Eric Gill. Augustus John, who had a studio in the Chenil's garden, exhibited his work continuously at the gallery. However, the studio which began as a countercultural "bohemian" enterprise was unable to compete with studios attracting younger artists, and failed in efforts to reinvent itself along more commercial lines. The ultimate failure of the enterprise bankrupted Knewstub, who some years later was seen by a former gallery patron peddling vegetables from a cart.

The record company Decca made its earliest recordings at the Chenil Gallery, and discographer Brian Rust noted that "the records made there invariably had a constricted sound that reminded listeners of the old acoustic method of recording".

As of the mid-2000s, the building still stood and the gallery location had become "more of a shopping arcade" still operating under the Chenil Galleries name, with author Suzy Gershman describing it as being "known as a good place for antique medical instruments, as well as 17th- and 18th-century paintings and smaller items", as well as costume jewelry.

== Selected exhibitions ==
In 1911, James Dickson Innes had a two-man exhibition with Eric Gill at the Chenil Gallery, London: "Sculptures by Mr Eric Gill and Landscapes by Mr J. D. Innes". Innes had a second exhibition at the Chenil in 1913, shortly before his unexpected death.

In 1914, the gallery exhibited David Bomberg's The Mud Bath as part of a solo exhibition of his work. A 1964 Tate Gallery report noted that the painting was "hung outside the Gallery premises that it may have every advantage of lighting and space".

Henry Tonks persuaded his former pupil, Edna Clarke Hall, to hold a one-woman show at the gallery in 1914. This show was a critical success, with one review describing her as a 'sensitive and expressive draughtswoman who reaches a masterly plane' and admiring her 'individual and instinctive' use of colour. Again in 1914, Augustus John facilitated sculptor Frank Dobson being able to stage a one-man show at the gallery.

In 1922 Leon Underwood had his first solo exhibition at the gallery. William Roberts, who had been an official war artist, had his first one-man show at the Chenil Gallery in 1923.

Augustus John's sister, Gwen John, had the only solo exhibition in her lifetime at the gallery in 1926. Alexander Stuart-Hill displayed at the gallery in 1927.

== Studio recordings ==
In 1926, John Barbirolli was invited to conduct a new ensemble at the gallery, initially called the "Chenil Chamber Orchestra" but later renamed "John Barbirolli's Chamber Orchestra". Barbirolli's concerts at the gallery impressed Frederic Austin, director of the British National Opera Company (BNOC), who in the same year invited him to conduct some performances with the company.

In 1930, jazz musician Spike Hughes first formed his own group and used the gallery as a recording venue for its music, in April of that year persuading the American musician Jimmy Dorsey to visit Chelsea for some sessions whilst he was in the UK. Duke Ellington and his orchestra recorded there in July 1933, including the track Hyde Park.
