= Borough Group =

Artists' collective in London

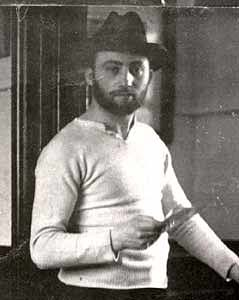
David Bomberg, leading light of the Borough Group.

The Borough Group was a collective of mid-20th-century artists from the Borough area of Southwark, South London. The group was associated with David Bomberg, who was then teaching a number of the artists that formed the group at the Borough Polytechnic, hence the name.

Cliff Holden founded the Borough Group in 1946 with the purpose of developing the ideas of fellow artist Bomberg, who taught at the then Borough Polytechnic during the 1940s and 1950s, and was the leading light of the movement. Not to be confused with the later Borough Bottega (1953–c.1955), which was founded later by Bomberg as a consciously hierarchical organisation that emulated his understanding of a Renaissance-style workshop.

In 1944, Holden met Bomberg at the City Literary Institute in London where the latter was teaching. In 1945, Bomberg began to teach evening Art classes at the Borough Polytechnic (now London South Bank University) until 1954 when he taught at the Bartlett School of Architecture. Holden initiated the group after consultation with Bomberg himself. Edna Mann, Dorothy Mead, and Peter Richmond (later Miles Richmond) were other founding members. Holden was first president of the group during 1946–48 at the suggestion of Bomberg. The group then extended to 11 members, including Dennis Creffield (best known for his drawings of English cathedrals), and Bomberg became president. The Borough Group was active until Spring 1951. During its existence, the group organised seven major exhibitions. The group reorganized with new members during 1953–56 as the Borough Bottega. Bomberg died a year later in 1957.

There are many reminders of Bomberg's teaching at the Borough Polytechnic at the present day University. Several works by Bomberg and Miles Peter Richmond hang around LSBU's campus and a student hall of residence is named after Bomberg, David Bomberg House on Borough High Street. The collection of the Tate Gallery includes paintings by Bomberg.

As of 2011, a Heritage Lottery Fund grant has been raised to allow a permanent display on David Bomberg and the Borough Group to be set up at London South Bank University, to open in Spring 2012.

== Members ==
Members of the Borough Group included:

- David Bomberg
- Lilian Holt Bomberg
- Dennis Creffield
- Cliff Holden
- Edna Mann
- Leslie Marr
- Dorothy Mead
- Dinora Mendelson
- Dorothy Missen
- Len Missen
- Miles Peter Richmond

== See also ==
- Borough Road Gallery, opened 2012
- List of British artists
