= London South Bank University =

Public university in London, England

Coordinates: 51.49814°N 0.10154°W

- Coat of arms
- Former names: Borough Polytechnic Institute (1892–1970), Polytechnic of the South Bank (1970–1987), South Bank Polytechnic (1987–1992)
- Type: Public
- Established: 1992 (university status); 30 September 1892 (Borough Polytechnic Institute)
- Affiliations: EUA
- Chancellor: Sir Simon Hughes
- Vice-Chancellor: Paul Kett
- Administrative staff: 1,700
- Students: 15,760 (2024/25)
- Undergraduates: 12,460 (2024/25)
- Postgraduates: 3,300 (2024/25)
- Location: Southwark, London, England, United Kingdom
- Campus: Urban
- Website: lsbu.ac.uk
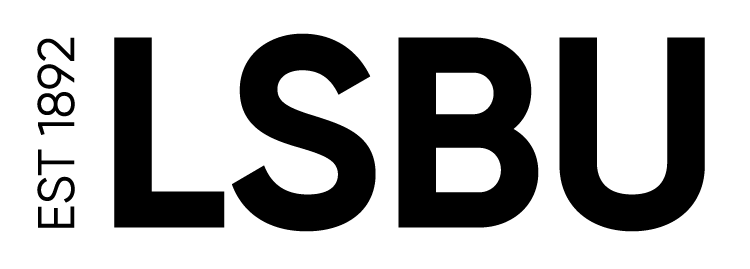

London South Bank University (LSBU) is a public university in Elephant and Castle, London. It is based in the London Borough of Southwark, near the South Bank of the River Thames, from which it takes its name. Founded in 1892 as the Borough Polytechnic Institute, it achieved university status in 1992 under the Further and Higher Education Act 1992.

In September 2003, the university underwent its most recent name change to become London South Bank University (LSBU) and has since opened several new centres including the School of Health and Social Care, the Centre for Efficient and Renewable Energy in Buildings (CEREB), a new Student Centre, an Enterprise Centre, and a new media centre Elephant Studios. The university has 16,840 students and 1,700 staff.

In November 2016, the university was named the Entrepreneurial University of the Year at the Times Higher Education Awards. In the inaugural 2017 Teaching Excellence Framework, London South Bank University was awarded a Silver rating and maintained the rating in the 2023 assessment.

== History ==
=== Origins ===
London South Bank University was founded in 1892 as the Borough Polytechnic Institute. It has since undergone several name changes, becoming the Polytechnic of the South Bank in 1970, South Bank Polytechnic in 1987, South Bank University in 1992 and London South Bank University in 2003. The university has also merged with a number of other educational institutions.

South London Polytechnic Institutes (Borough Road Site) Act 1890
- Act of Parliament
- Parliament of the United Kingdom
- Long title: An Act to authorize the purchase of a Site in Southwark for the South London Polytechnic Institutes.
- Citation: 53 & 54 Vict. c. ix
- Territorial extent: United Kingdom

Dates
- Royal assent: 2 May 1890
- Commencement: 2 May 1890 (Note: The Acts of Parliament (Commencement) Act 1793.)
- Repealed: 31 January 2013
Other legislation
Repealed by	Statute Law (Repeals) Act 2013

Status: Repealed

In 1888, Edric Bayley, a local solicitor and member of the London School Board, set up the South London Polytechnics Committee whose members included the Lord Mayor of London, Archbishop of Canterbury, Lord Salisbury, Lord Rosebery and Sir Lyon Playfair. The committee was successful in persuading the Charity Commissioners to pledge to match whatever could be raised from the public, up to the sum of £200,000 to establish polytechnics in South London. A public meeting at Mansion House launched the public appeal, and by 1891 enough money had been raised to establish polytechnics at Battersea and at Borough Road, Southwark, now LSBU.

During 1890, the former buildings of Joseph Lancaster's British and Foreign School Society were purchased for the Borough Polytechnic Institute. In May that year, the South London Polytechnics Institutes Act was passed, so that by June 1891 the governing structure and general aims of the new Institute had been created. These aims were "the promotion of the industrial skills, general knowledge, health, and well-being of young men and women" and also for "instruction suitable for persons intending to emigrate". W. M. Richardson was chosen to be clerk to the governing body, C. T. Millis was appointed as Headmaster, Miss Helen Smith was appointed Lady Superintendent and Edric Bayley was appointed the first Chair of Governors.

On 30 September 1892, the Borough Polytechnic Institute was officially opened by Lord Rosebery, with a remit to educate the local community in a range of practical skills. The polytechnic was given a seal based on the Bridge House emblem of the City of London and a motto taken from Ecclesiastes — "Do it with thy Might". A gala event was held to mark the occasion which was widely reported in the press because of Lord Rosebery's speech on the banning of smoking in the new Institute. One of the speeches made included the hope that "the Polytechnic would do its share towards perfecting many a valuable gem found in the slums of London".

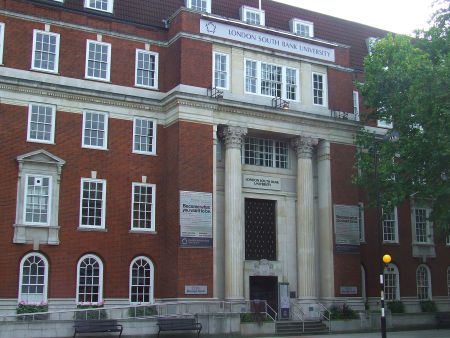
Borough Road Entrance

The polytechnic specialised in courses that reflected local trades including leather tanning, typography, metalwork, electrical engineering, laundry, baking, and boot & shoe manufacture. Instruction was also given in art, science, elocution, literature and general knowledge and the polytechnic held public lectures by the likes of George Bernard Shaw, J. A. Hobson, Henry M. Stanley, and Ralph Vaughan Williams.

On 10 October 1894, the National School of Bakery and Confectionery (later the National Bakery School) was opened with 78 pupils. In 1897, the polytechnic was let to sightseers who wished to see the Diamond Jubilee parade for Queen Victoria.

In 1902, the Borough Road building was once again let to sightseers who wished to see the Coronation parade of King Edward VII. Through a donation from Edric Bayley, the Edric Hall was built in 1908, along with the Lancaster Street extension buildings which gave the Polytechnic new bakery rooms, gymnasium, workshops and its triangular campus site.

In 1911, the Governors commissioned Roger Fry to create a set of seven murals to decorate the student dining room with the theme of "London on Holiday". These comprised:

- "Bathing" and "Football", Duncan Grant
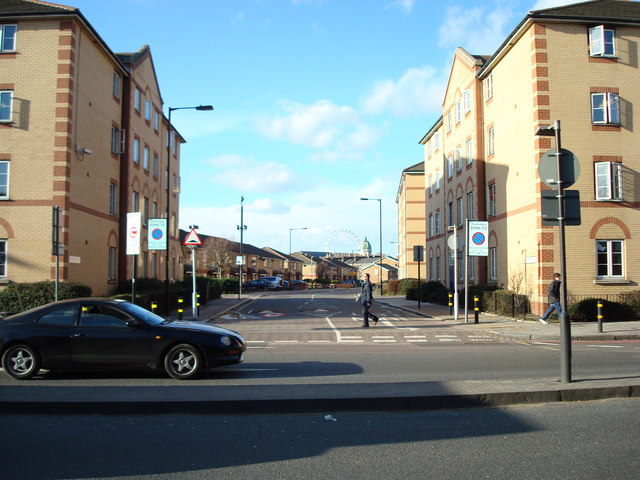
- London South Bank University accommodation at Dante Road
  "The Zoo", Roger Fry
- "The Fair", Frederick Etchells
- "Toy Sailing Boats", Bernard Adeney
- "Punch & Judy", MacDonald Gill
- "Paddling", Albert Rutherston

In 1931, they were sold to the Tate Gallery.

During the First World War, the polytechnic manufactured munitions and gas masks for the war effort and ran courses for the army. After the War, the National Certificate system was taken up, engineering courses were offered to women in the 1920s and printing classes were dropped and run at Morley College. J W Bispham was elected the new Principal in 1922 when C T Millis retired and a rebuilding scheme was undertaken including a new facade for the Borough Road building. Class numbers increased to 8,682 students by 1927 and on 20 February 1930 the Duke of York officially opened the polytechnic's new buildings. In 1933, Dr D H Ingall took over as Principal and a sports ground at Turney Road Dulwich was obtained for the polytechnic. In 1933, farriery was dropped as it was too difficult to bring horses into the building.

During the Second World War, a third of the polytechnic's campus was destroyed or damaged from the Blitz. Southwark was bombed seven times and its population halved by the end of the War. At the start of the War the boys and girls from the polytechnic's Trade Schools were evacuated to Exeter. From 1940 to 1941, the polytechnic was bombed five times but continued to provide hundreds of meals a day to the homeless of Southwark during this period.

From 1945 to 1953, British painter David Bomberg taught art at the polytechnic forming the 'Borough Group' of artists with his pupils in 1946. In 1956, the polytechnic was designated a Regional College of Technology and Dr J E Garside was installed as the new Principal until 1965, when Vivian Pereira-Mendoza took over. Further extensions to the buildings were made during the 1960s with the opening of the National College Wing in 1961 and the extension buildings and Tower Block in 1969, which were officially opened by Prince Philip, Duke of Edinburgh.

In 1970, the Brixton School of Building (founded in 1904), the City of Westminster College (founded in 1918 – and not the same institution as the current City of Westminster College) and the National College of Heating, Ventilating, Refrigeration and Fan Engineering (founded in 1947) merged with the polytechnic to become the Polytechnic of the South Bank. The new institution adopted a coat of arms designed to include two Thames barges set above a pentagon surrounded by five other pentagons. An official designation service took place the following year, at which Margaret Thatcher was the guest speaker. In 1972 the purpose-built Wandsworth Road site opened, providing space for the polytechnic's Faculty of the Built Environment, which at the time was the biggest and most comprehensive faculty in Europe for teaching built environment subjects such as surveying, town planning, architecture, civil engineering and other property related professional disciplines. In 1975, the extensive London Road building was opened, providing space for expanding business courses and the library. In 1976 the Battersea College of Education merged with the polytechnic, bringing sites at Manresa House, Roehampton and Manor House, Clapham Common. Battersea College of Education was previously known as Battersea College of Domestic Science (1948 to 1965). Also in 1976, part of Rachel MacMillan College of Education merged with the polytechnic.

In 1985 South Bank Technopark opened on London Road and in 1987 the polytechnic changed its name again to become South Bank Polytechnic. In the same year, the British Youth Opera (BYO) was founded and made a home at the polytechnic's Southwark campus. In 1987, Pauline Perry, Baroness Perry of Southwark was appointed Director, who oversaw the conversion of the polytechnic into a flagship university.

In 1990, the polytechnic was accredited for research degrees, and in 1991 the Central Catering College at Waterloo and South West London College merged with it. In 1992, the newly created Baroness Perry (August 1991) became the university's first vice-chancellor.

In 1992, the polytechnic was granted university status and accordingly changed its name to South Bank University. That year also saw the new university celebrate its centenary and adopt the marketing slogan, "the University without Ivory Towers". In 1993, Gerald Bernbaum was appointed vice-chancellor and the Centenary Library was renamed the Perry Library. Redwood College of Health Studies and Great Ormond Street School of Nursing merged with the university in 1995, leading to the establishment of two satellite campuses teaching Health at Havering and Whipps Cross (which closed in 2011).

=== 21st century ===
In 2001, Deian Hopkin became vice-chancellor and the Wandsworth Road site was sold.

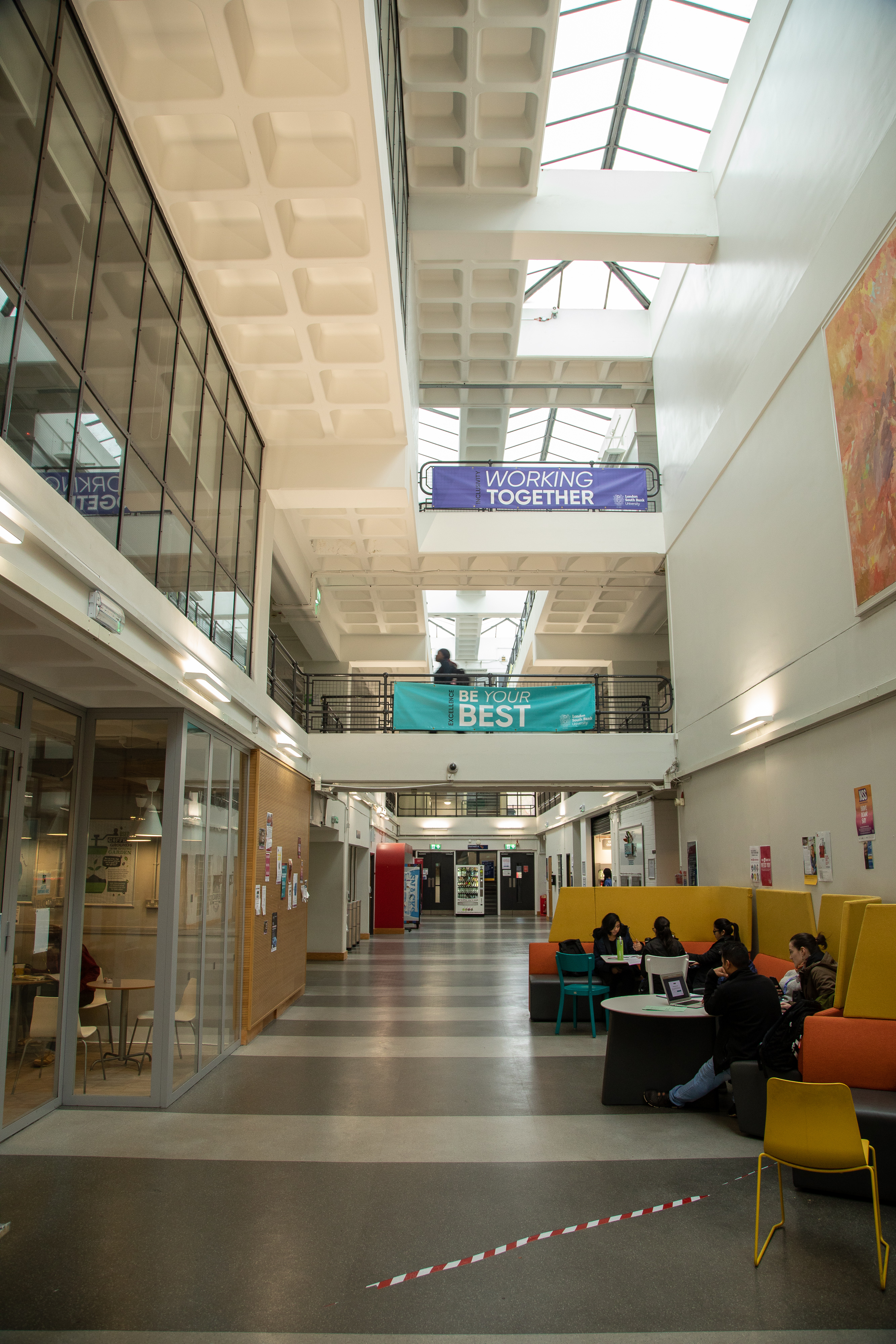
Inside London South Bank University

On 1 September 2003, the university underwent its most recent name change to become London South Bank University (LSBU) and in that year officially opened the Keyworth Centre. Martin Earwicker was appointed Vice-Chancellor in 2009, the year in which another major building on their Southwark campus, the Grimshaw-designed K2, was opened to house the School of Health and Social Care and the Centre for Efficient and Renewable Energy in Buildings (CEREB). The building also houses skills laboratories for the university's nursing students. Further campus developments included a new Student Centre in 2012, followed by an Enterprise Centre in 2013. In 2016 LSBU opened its new media centre, Elephant Studios at LSBU.

On 1 January 2014, Dave Phoenix was appointed Vice-Chancellor.

In 2014, university officials removed a poster featuring the Flying Spaghetti Monster and the stand erected by the students from the South Bank Atheist Society during the Fresher's week, claiming it was "religiously offensive". This action drew criticism from the British Humanist Association which claimed it amounted to "petty censorship in the name of offence".

The LSBU-sponsored University Academy of Engineering South Bank opened its doors to students in September 2014. The purpose-built facility is in the Walworth area of Camberwell and can accommodate 150 students aged 11–19.

Lambeth College is intending to merge with the university.

== Campus ==
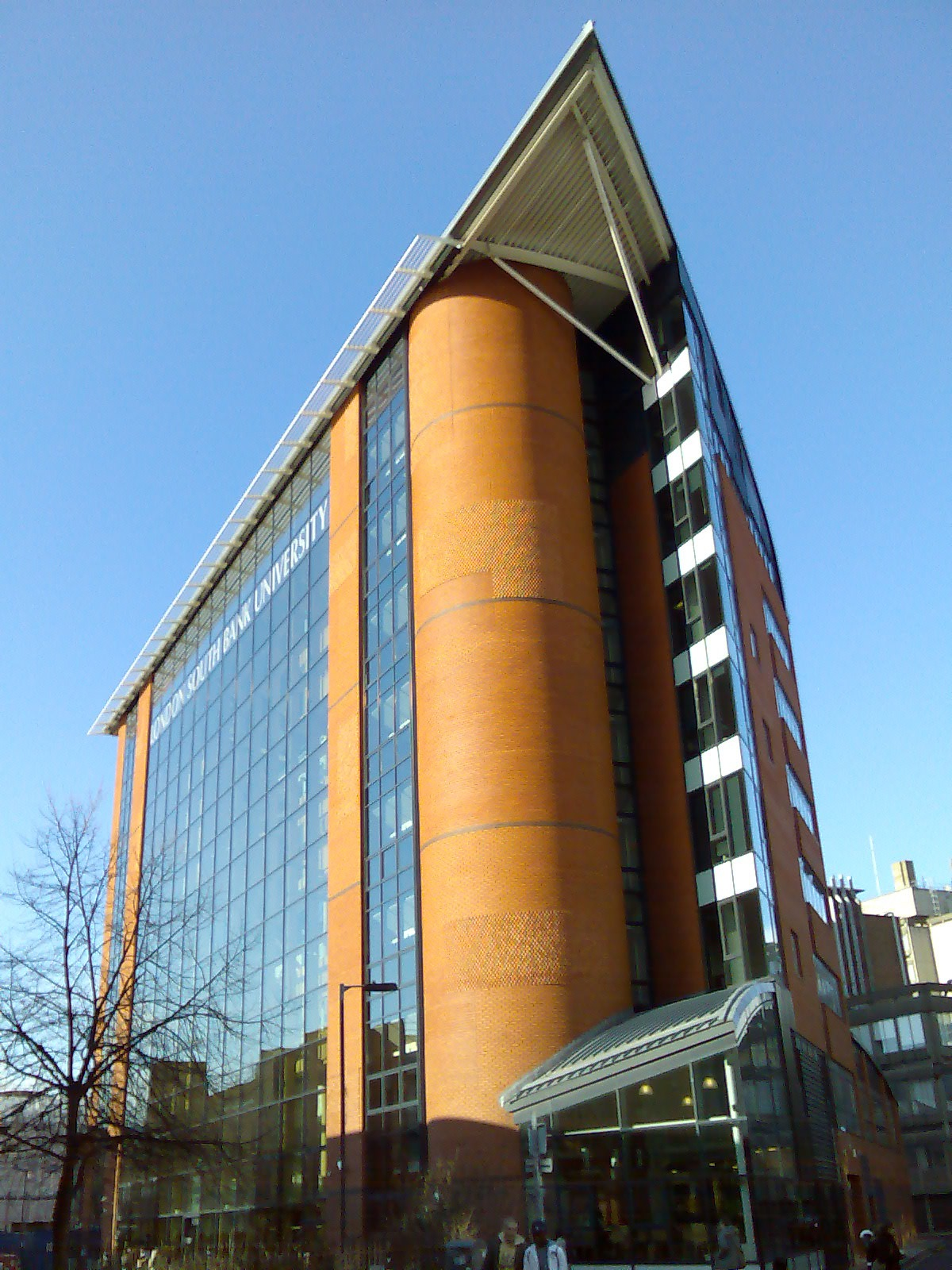
London South Bank University's Keyworth Centre

The main campus populates a triangular section of roads in the Borough of Southwark, immediately north of the Elephant and Castle. London's South Bank is a short tube or bus journey away from Waterloo or London Bridge. To the north of the campus is Borough Road, where the main entrance is situated and the original building of the Borough Polytechnic Institute. To the west is London Road and to the east is Southwark Bridge Road. At the northwest corner is St George's Circus.

Schiller International University had a campus in the Technopark Building on the London South Bank University property. In August 2011 Schiller stated that it was closing its London campus and will not start the Autumn 2011 semester there, due to stricter student visa requirements in the United Kingdom. A central Croydon campus opened in October 2021 at Electric House in Wellesley Road.

== Organisation ==
The university has seven Schools, they are;

- School of Applied Sciences
- School of Arts and Creative Industries
- School of the Built Environment and Architecture
- School of Business
- School of Engineering
- School of Health and Social Care
- School of Law and Social Sciences

=== Contraction ===
The university announced in April 2021 that in 2021 they were not admitting students to study history or human geography.

== Academic profile ==
The British painter David Bomberg taught Art at the Borough Polytechnic between 1945 and 1954. One of the university's halls of residence, David Bomberg House, carries his name and a handful of his works are on display at the university. Major paintings by Bomberg were acquired by the Tate Gallery after his death.

London South Bank University works in partnership with institutions in the UK, Europe, Africa, the Americas and Asia. It currently works closely with the Beijing Institute of Technology, Hunan University, Beijing University of Posts and Telecommunications, Northwestern Polytechnical University, and the National Academy of Education Administration. The collaborative educational programmes both at undergraduate and postgraduate levels have been running for over ten years with the Chinese partners. LSBU established the first Confucius Institute for Traditional Chinese Medicine in 2007.

=== Rankings and reputation ===
Rankings
National rankings
- Complete (2027): 112
- Guardian (2027): 77
- Times / Sunday Times (2027): 111

Global rankings
- QS (2027): 901–950
- THE (2026): 601–800

In November 2016, the university was named the Entrepreneurial University of the Year at the Times Higher Education Awards.

The Guardian's 2018 league table of teaching excellence ranked the university 92 out of 121 British institutions. The Sunday Times' league table, measuring a number of different factors including teaching quality, research quality and employment rates, ranks the university 120th. However, The Guardian rated LSBU joint 13th for law students.

In the inaugural 2017 Teaching Excellence Framework assessment which ranked the quality of undergraduate teaching across UK universities and applied either a bronze, silver or gold ranking, LSBU was awarded a "Silver" ranking.

=== Admissions ===
70% of UK students at London South Bank University are Londoners. Students primarily come from the South London Boroughs of Southwark, Lambeth, Lewisham and Croydon, and the East London Borough of Newham. Around 12% of students are from overseas, which equate to over 3,000 EU and other international students, from more than 130 countries. 56% of the student population are from ethnic minorities and over 80% of the students are classified as mature (21 or over when they start their course).

== Notable alumni ==
- Sir David Adjaye, architect
- Frank Auerbach, painter
- Shaun Bailey, politician
- Anton Balasingham, political strategist and Advisor for LTTE leadership
- Sue Black, computer scientist
- Paul Burstow, former politician
- Mel Calman, cartoonist
- Edd China, television presenter and engineer
- June Clark, nurse
- Marsha de Cordova, politician
- Dennis Creffield, artist
- Brenda Dacres, politician
- Cassiel Ato Forson, politician
- Faith Gibson, British nurse, academic, and researcher
- Lewis Hancox, graphic novelist, social media personality and filmmaker
- Cliff Holden, painter
- Edna Adan Ismail, former foreign minister of Somaliland
- Jordan Kensington
- Leon Kossoff (Art)
- Don Lawrence (Illustration)
- Nick Leslau (Surveying)
- Russel Lissack, musician
- Norma Major, philanthropist and wife of Sir John Major
- Shahid Malik, politician
- Kevin McGrath (Estate management)
- Zacarias Moussaoui (International business)
- Sarah Mullally (Nursing)
- Wavinya Ndeti, politician
- Bridget Prentice (Law)
- Yasmin Qureshi, Politician
- Bali Rai (Politics)
- Miles Richmond (Art)
- Joan Ryan, politician
- Patrik Schumacher, architect, company director Zaha Hadid Architects
- Greg Searle
- Suresh Raj Sharma, founder of Kathmandu University
- Enoch Showunmi (Business)
- Edward Skoyles
- Phil Spencer (Estate management)
- Mike Weatherley, politician
- Charlie Whiting
- Louise Woodward (Law)

== See also ==
- Armorial of UK universities
- Borough Road Gallery, opened 2012
- List of universities in the UK
- Post-1992 university
