= City Lit =

Coordinates: 51.5149°N 0.1202°W

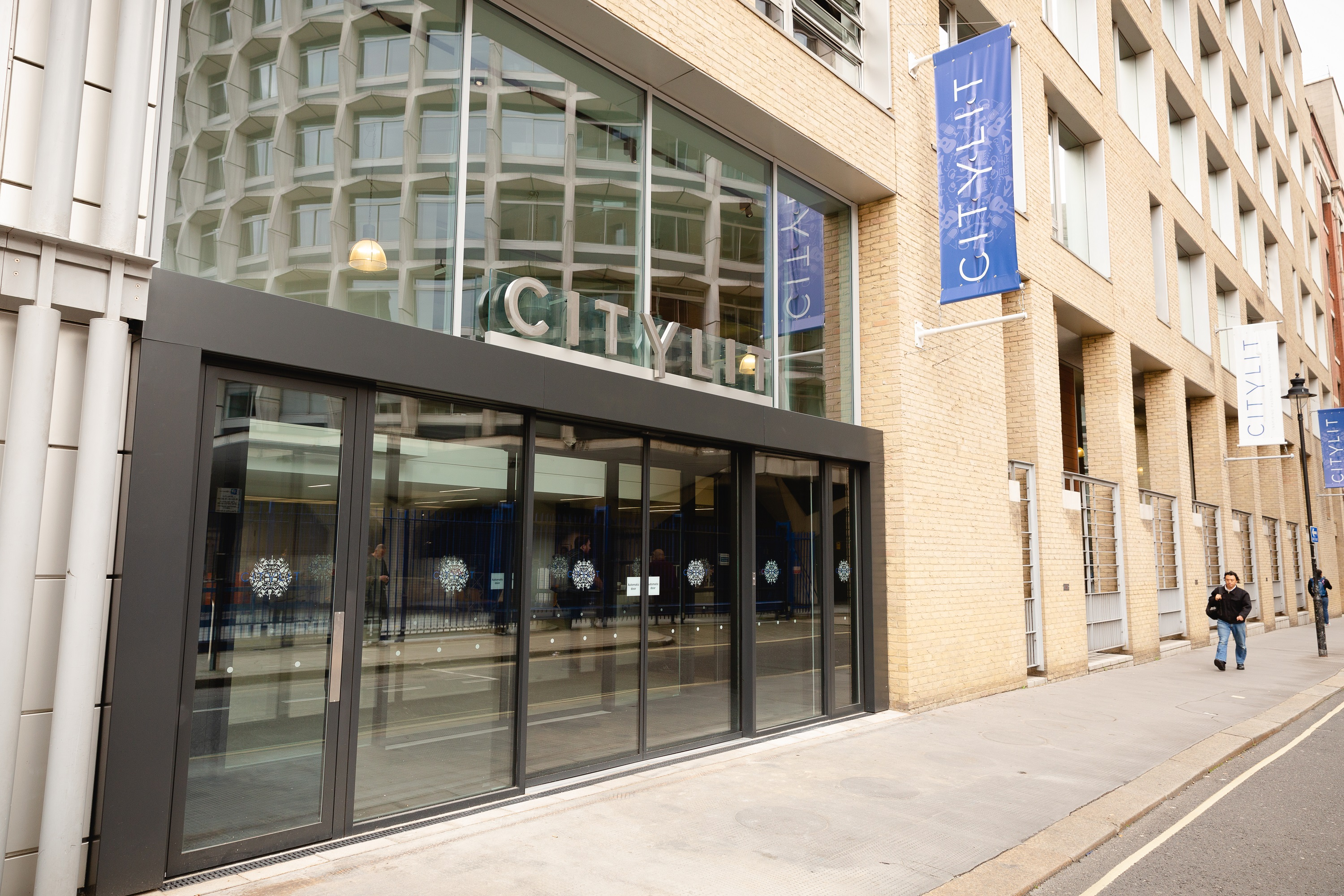
- City Lit in Keeley Street

Location
- Keeley Street; Holborn, London, WC2B 4BA; England

Information
- Type: Adult education college
- Established: 1919
- Ofsted: Reports
- Principal & Chief Executive: Mark Malcomson
- Age: 18+
- Enrolment: 26,590
- Website: http://www.citylit.ac.uk/

City Lit is an adult education college in Holborn, central London, founded by the London County Council in 1919, which has charitable status. It offers part-time courses across four schools and five "centres of expertise", covering humanities and sciences, languages, performing arts, visual arts, deaf education, family learning, community outreach, learning disabilities education, speech therapy and universal skills.

In 2011, City Lit was graded as "outstanding" by government inspectors Ofsted. Then, in 2016, it was ranked "outstanding" for "personal development, behaviour and welfare" and "good" in four other categories. More recently in May 2023, City Lit was graded as "outstanding" by Ofsted in all five categories which are: The quality of education, behaviour and attitudes, personal development, leadership and management and adult learning programmes.

== History ==
In 1918, following the war, the London County Council wanted to strengthen non-vocational education. It approved the opening of five literary institutes: Plumstead and Woolwich, Marylebone, Dalston, Peckham, and City Literary Institute (City Lit). They took their first students in September 1919. At the time, it was a radically different approach to adult education. The City Lit's first four classrooms were leased from a teacher training college. City Lit is now the sole survivor of London's Literary Institute movement.

Among the very first courses City Lit offered in 1919 were lipreading classes for Londoners returning with damaged hearing from the battlefields of the First World War.

In 1939, City Lit moved to its first purpose-built home in Stukeley Street, off Drury Lane. The new building was officially opened by the then Poet Laureate, John Masefield, and contained a theatre, concert hall and gym.

City Lit never closed its doors in the war; during the Blitz classes took place in air raid shelters, on the platforms of Covent Garden and Holborn Tube station, one music tutor even wheeled a piano underground for recitals.

In 2005, City Lit moved from its building in Stukeley Street to new, purpose designed premises in nearby Keeley Street, which are fully accessible and include facilities such as studio spaces (for visual arts, drama and health and movement), "supported learning centre" (library), roof terrace with a herb garden, theatre and music recital room. Since then, they have also opened new photography, fashion and digital arts studios.

In 2019, City Lit celebrated its centenary with a year of events reflecting upon the previous 100 years. At the City Lit Centenary Awards, The Princess Royal was awarded the Centenary Fellowship for her outstanding contribution to adult learning.

In early December 2022, City Lit suffered a severe IT outage, with the central website and a number of online resources becoming unavailable.

== Courses ==
City Lit offers subjects in the areas of art, drama, dance, creative writing, history and politics, philosophy, languages ranging from French and German to Persian and Korean, computing, counselling, music, and fitness. Its courses are held across nine schools and "centres of expertise":

- School of Humanities and Sciences
- School of Languages
- School of Performing Arts
- School of Visual Arts
- Centre for Deaf Education
- Centre for Family Learning and Community Outreach
- Centre for Learning Disabilities Education
- Centre for Speech Therapy
- Centre for Universal Skills

The college also offers specialist areas, including education for deaf adults, courses for adults with learning disabilities, and work in stammering therapy.

== Events ==
City Lit hosts a programme of visual arts exhibitions, drama productions, musical performances, book launches, creative writing performances, stand-up comedy, festivals, talks and lectures.

Flagship events include Deaf Day; one of the UK's biggest gatherings for Deaf and hard of hearing people, and the annual Mental Wealth Festival, in partnership with Beyond Words and The National Gallery, bringing together professionals and key stakeholders to discuss mental health issues, providing a forum for informative, challenging and inspiring discussions and workshops exploring mental health issues. Speakers and contributors of the Mental Wealth Festival include Grayson Perry CBE, Ed Balls, Jonny Benjamin MBE, Dr Kathryn Mannix and Antony Gormley.

== Notable alumni ==
- Steven Berkoff – actor
- David Bowie – musician
- Souad Faress – actress
- Esther Freud – author
- Kerry Godliman – comedian
- Natacha Karam – actress
- Andrea Levy – author
- Mikko Mäkelä – filmmaker
- Shazia Mirza – comedian
- Michelle Magorian – author
- Francesca Martinez – comedian
- Malorie Blackman – author
- Moira Young – author

== Notable lecturers ==
- Edmund Blunden
- G. K. Chesterton
- T. S. Eliot
- Dorothy Sayers
- Edith Sitwell
- Dylan Thomas
- Rebecca West

== City Lit Fellows ==
- HRH The Princess Royal
- Gillian Anderson OBE
- Ed Balls
- Malorie Blackman OBE
- The Rt. Hon Sir Vince Cable
- The Rt Hon. David Lammy MP
- Francesca Martinez
- Jonathan Miller CBE
- Grayson Perry CBE RA
- Ruby Wax OBE

== Accolades and criticism ==
In 2007 City Lit was the first adult education college to be given the Queen's Anniversary Prize, to mark its international reputation in stammering therapy.

In 2014, proposed cuts and redundancies, including to university access, English and maths GCSE courses, and deaf education, attracted controversy. The Guardian reports a "senior source" blamed the government and warned "We got outstanding in our last inspection. How are we going to maintain that outstanding education with fewer staff?". Criticism was directed at the college's marketing budget and the expansion of short courses such as "graffiti" cross-stitch, beer tasting and burlesque. Principal Mark Malcomson said the advertising expenditure was intended in part to support "more charitable provision" in the future.

In 2016 City Lit were graded "Good" by government Ofsted inspectors, down from 2011's "Outstanding".

In 2018, Russell Alderson, tutor in the Centre for Deaf Education was shortlisted for the Times Educational Supplement FE Awards Teacher of the Year award.

In 2019, Fiona Pickett was awarded the Festival of Learning Tutor of the Year award.

In 2019, City Lit was awarded the Festival of Learning President's Award for its outstanding contribution to adult education over 100 years.

In 2019, City Lit Students Sylvia Rowbottom and Dace Miksite were named Finalist Winners at the Festival of Learning Awards for their commitment to adult learning.

== See also ==
Other adult education providers in Camden, London include the nearby Mary Ward Centre, Birkbeck College (a university), and the Working Men's College.
