= David Bomberg =

British painter (1890–1957)

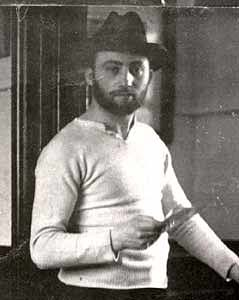
- Photograph of David Bomberg, c.1925.
- Born: David Bomberg; 5 December 1890; Birmingham, England
- Died: 19 August 1957 (aged 66); London, England
- Education: Westminster School of Art, Slade School of Art
- Employer: Borough Polytechnic
- Known for: Painting, drawing, teaching
- Movement: Vorticism, Cubism, Futurism

David Garshen Bomberg (5 December 1890 – 19 August 1957) was a British painter, and one of the Whitechapel Boys.

Bomberg was one of the most audacious of the exceptional generation of artists who studied at the Slade School of Art under Henry Tonks, and which included Mark Gertler, Stanley Spencer, C.R.W. Nevinson, and Dora Carrington. He was expelled from the Slade School of Art in 1913, with agreement between senior teachers Tonks, Frederick Brown and Philip Wilson Steer, because of the audacity of his breach from the conventional approach of that time.

Bomberg painted a series of complex geometric compositions combining the influences of cubism and futurism in the years immediately preceding World War I; typically using a limited number of striking colours, turning humans into simple, angular shapes, and sometimes overlaying the whole painting a strong grid-work colouring scheme.

Whether because his faith in the machine age had been shattered by his experiences as a private soldier in the trenches or because of the pervasive retrogressive attitude towards modernism in Britain, Bomberg moved to a more figurative style in the 1920s and his work became increasingly dominated by portraits and landscapes drawn from nature. Gradually developing a more expressionist technique, he travelled widely through the Middle East and Europe.

From 1945 to 1953, Bomberg worked as a teacher at Borough Polytechnic (now London South Bank University) in London, where his pupils included Frank Auerbach, Leon Kossoff, Philip Holmes, Cliff Holden, Edna Mann, Dorothy Mead, Gustav Metzger, Dennis Creffield, Cecil Bailey, and Miles Richmond. David Bomberg House, one of the student halls of residences at London South Bank University, is named in his honour. He was married to landscape painter Lilian Holt.

== Early years ==
Self-Portrait (1931), charcoal and wash.

David Bomberg was born in the Lee Bank area of Birmingham on 5 December 1890. He was the seventh of eleven children of a Polish Jewish immigrant leatherworker, Abraham, and his wife Rebecca. He was Orthodox but she less so and supported David's painting ambitions. In 1895, his family moved to Whitechapel in the East End of London where he was to spend the rest of his childhood.

After studying art at City and Guilds, Bomberg returned to Birmingham to train as a lithographer but quit to study under Walter Sickert at Westminster School of Art from 1908 to 1910. Sickert's emphasis on the study of form and the representation of the "gross material facts" of urban life were an important early influence on Bomberg, alongside Roger Fry's 1910 exhibition Manet and the Post-Impressionists, where he first saw the work of Paul Cézanne.

Bomberg's artistic studies had involved considerable financial hardship but in 1911, with the help of John Singer Sargent and the Jewish Education Aid Society, he was able to attain a place at the Slade School of Art.

== The Slade ==
Vision of Ezekiel, 1912, oil on canvas. Tate Gallery.

At the Slade School of Fine Art Bomberg was one of the remarkable generation of artists described by their drawing master Henry Tonks as the School's second and last "crisis of brilliance" and which included Stanley Spencer, Paul Nash, Ben Nicholson, Mark Gertler and Isaac Rosenberg. (The "first crisis of brilliance" had occurred in the 1890s, with Augustus John, William Orpen and others.) Bomberg and Rosenberg, from similar backgrounds, had met some years earlier and became close friends as a result of their mutual interests.

The emphasis in teaching at the Slade was on technique and draughtsmanship, to which Bomberg was well suited – winning the Tonks Prize for his drawing of fellow student Rosenberg in 1911. His own style was rapidly moving away from these traditional methods, however, particularly under the influence of the March 1912 London exhibition of Italian Futurists that exposed him to the dynamic abstraction of Francis Picabia and Gino Severini, and Fry's second Post Impressionist exhibition in October of the same year, which displayed the works of Pablo Picasso, Henri Matisse and the Fauvists alongside those of Wyndham Lewis, Duncan Grant and Vanessa Bell.

Bomberg's response to this became clear in paintings such as Vision of Ezekiel (1912), in which he proved "he could absorb the most experimental European ideas, fuse these with Jewish influences and come up with a robust alternative of his own." His dynamic, angular representations of the human form, combining the geometrical abstraction of cubism with the energy of the Futurists, established his reputation as a forceful member of the avant-garde and the most audacious of his contemporaries; bringing him to the attention of Wyndham Lewis (who visited him in 1912) and Filippo Marinetti. In 1913, the year in which he was expelled from the Slade because of the radicalism of his approach, he travelled to France with Jacob Epstein, where among others he met Amedeo Modigliani, André Derain and Pablo Picasso.

== Pre-war avant-garde ==
The Mud Bath (1914; Tate Gallery).

Expelled from the Slade in the Summer of 1913, Bomberg formed a series of loose affiliations with several groups involved with the contemporary English avant-garde, embarking on a brief and acrimonious association with the Bloomsbury Group's Omega Workshops before exhibiting with the Camden Town Group in December 1913. His enthusiasm for the dynamism and aesthetics of the machine age gave him a natural affinity with Wyndham Lewis's emerging vorticist movement, and five of his works featured in the founding exhibition of the London Group in 1914. Still, Bomberg was staunchly independent and despite Lewis' attempts he never officially joined Vorticism. In July 1914 he refused involvement with the Vorticist literary magazine BLAST and in June of the following year his work featured only in the "Invited to show" section of the vorticist exhibition at London's Dore Gallery. In 1914 he met his first wife Alice Mayes a resourceful and practical woman about ten years older than him who had worked with Kosslov's Ballet Company. Their mutual interest in experimental dance and the Russian ballet may have helped bring them together. Alice helped Bomberg in the early part of his career both with financial support and in influencing his appearance and character. 1914 saw the highpoint of his early career – a solo exhibition at the Chenil Gallery in Chelsea which attracted positive reviews from Roger Fry and T. E. Hulme and attracted favourable attention from experimental artists nationally and internationally. The exhibition featured several of Bomberg's early masterpieces, most notably The Mud Bath (1914), which was hung on an outside wall surrounded by Union Flags – causing "the horses drawing the 29 bus... to shy at it as they came round the corner of King's Road."

"I look upon Nature while I live in a steel city" he explained in the exhibition catalogue "I APPEAL to a Sense of Form ... My object is the construction of Pure Form. I reject everything in painting that is not Pure Form."

With the help of Augustus John, Bomberg sold two paintings from this exhibition to the influential American collector John Quinn. Alice and David enjoyed a trip to Paris with the proceeds of the sale of several pictures in 1914 which led to them marrying in 1916 after Bomberg had enlisted in the Royal Engineers in November 1915.

== World War I and after ==
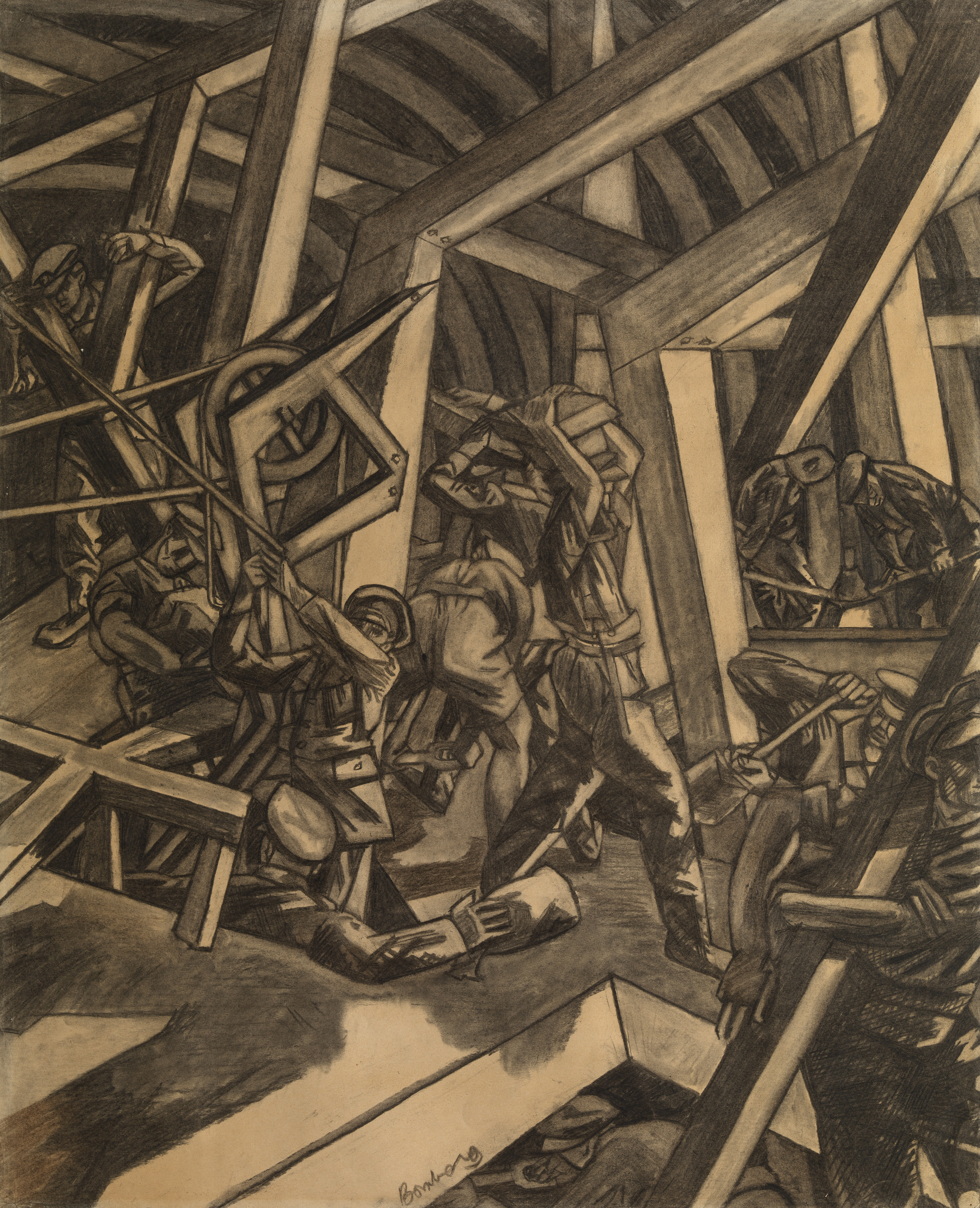
Sappers at Work: A Canadian Tunnelling Company, Hill 60, St Eloi by David Bomberg, which bears a reference to 1st Canadian Tunnelling Company.

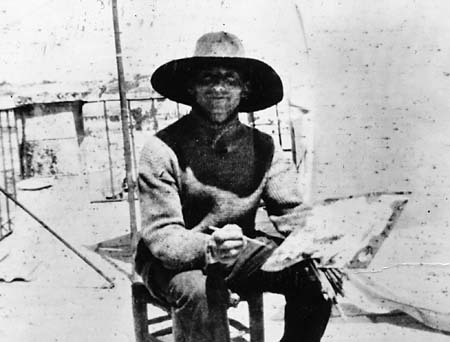
Photograph of David Bomberg, taken in Jerusalem, 1924.

Despite the success of his Chenil Gallery exhibition Bomberg continued to be dogged by financial problems. In 1915, he enlisted in the Royal Engineers, transferring in 1916 to the King's Royal Rifle Corps and in March of that year, shortly after marrying his first wife, being sent to the Western Front.

World War I was to bring a profound change to Bomberg's outlook. His experiences of its mechanized slaughter and the death of his brother in the trenches – as well as those of his friend Isaac Rosenberg and his supporter T. E. Hulme – permanently destroyed his faith in the aesthetics of the machine age. This can be seen most clearly in his commission for the Canadian War Memorials Fund, Sappers at Work (1918–1919): his first version of the painting was dismissed as a "futurist abortion" and was replaced by a second far more representational version.

The artist's book Russian Ballet, 1919, was the last work to use the pre-war vorticist idiom. Bomberg self-published this work whilst waiting for the Canadian Government's verdict on Sappers at Work; the next few years was to see him 'experimenting with ways of making his stark pre-war style more rounded and organic'.

In radical opposition to the prevailing currents in avant-garde art, stimulated as these were by the enthusiasm for mechanization in Constructivism in Russia following the Revolution, Bomberg went to paint and draw in Palestine between 1923 and 1927, with the assistance of the Zionist Organization. There he brought together the geometric energies of his pre-war work as an "English cubist" with the tradition of figurative observation of the English landscape school of Turner, Constable, Girtin and John Sell Cotman.

== The return to order ==
Tregor and Tregoff, Cornwall, 1947, Tate Gallery

From there followed Bomberg's great period of painting and drawing in landscape, in Spain at Toledo (1928), Ronda (1934–35 and 1954–57) and Asturias (1935), in Cyprus (1948) and intermittently in Britain, perhaps most powerfully in Cornwall. A six-month stay at Odessa in the Soviet Union in the second half of 1933, following Hitler's seizure of power in Germany, led Bomberg on his return to London to immediate resignation from the Communist Party.

During World War II, he painted Evening in the City of London (1944), showing the blitzed city viewed rising up to a triumphant, surviving St Paul's Cathedral on the horizon, since described as the "most moving of all paintings of wartime Britain" (Martin Harrison). He also painted a series of flower paintings saturated with turbulent feeling, and his single commission as a war artist, a series of "Bomb Store" paintings (1942) expressing Bomberg's expanded first-hand sense of the destructive powers of modern technology in warfare. These "Bomb Store" paintings convey a premonitory sense of the massive explosion that destroyed the underground store in Staffordshire two years later, killing around 70 people, and bear comparison with Piranesi's Carceri etchings.

Bomberg's superb draughtsmanship was expressed also in a lifelong series of portraits, from the early period of his Botticelli-like "Head of a Poet" (1913), a pencil portrait of his friend the poet Isaac Rosenberg for which he won the Henry Tonks Prize at the Slade, to his "Last Self-Portrait" (1956), painted at Ronda, a meditation also on Rembrandt.

Following a collapse in Ronda, Bomberg died in London in 1957, his critical stock rising sharply thereafter. One of Bomberg's admirers, the painter Patrick Swift, unearthed and edited Bomberg's pensées, and was later to publish them, along with images of Bomberg's work, as 'The Bomberg Papers' in his ‘X’ magazine (June 1960). After his early success before the First World War, he was in his lifetime the most brutally excluded artist in Britain. Having lived for years on the earnings of his second wife, fellow artist Lilian Holt and remittances from his sister Kitty, he died in absolute poverty.

== Posthumous reception ==
Thirty years after his death, a major retrospective of Bomberg's work curated by Richard Cork was held at the Tate Gallery, London, in 1988.

In 2006, Abbot Hall Art Gallery in Kendal, Cumbria, mounted the first major exhibition of Bomberg's paintings for nearly twenty years: David Bomberg: Spirit in the Mass (17 July – 28 October 2006). Prior to that, the exhibition David Bomberg en Ronda at the Museo Joaquin Peinado in Ronda in Andalusia (1–30 October 2004) showed work by Bomberg in the city and environment which he had celebrated in paintings and drawings in 1934-35 and 1954–57. Work from one of the best collections in private hands was shown on the fiftieth anniversary of his death in the exhibition In celebration of David Bomberg 1890-1957 at Daniel Katz Gallery, Old Bond Street, London (30 May – 13 July 2007).

London South Bank University, the site of Bomberg's teaching at the former Borough Polytechnic, received a gift of more than 150 paintings and drawings by Bomberg and his students in the Borough Group – principally Dorothy Mead, Cliff Holden, Miles Richmond, and Dennis Creffield — the David Bomberg Legacy. The gallery, formally launched on 14 June 2012, to display the artworks donated to the university by Sarah Rose has been made possible by the Heritage Lottery Fund. The collection is the work of Sarah Rose, who built her collection over thirty years. The London South Bank University Borough Road Gallery planned to hold two exhibitions a year, drawn from the Sarah Rose collection.

The Nasher Museum of Art at Duke University held an exhibition entitled The Vorticists: Rebel Artists in London and New York, 1914-18 from 30 September 2010 through 2 January 2011. Tate Britain held an exhibition entitled The Vorticists: Manifesto for a Modern World between 14 June and 4 September 2011. In the 2011 BBC series, British Masters, Bomberg was singled out as being one of the greatest painters of the 20th Century. He was one of the six artists included in Dulwich Picture Gallery's 2013 summer exhibition, "Nash, Nevinson, Spencer, Gertler, Carrington, Bomberg: A Crisis of Brilliance, 1908-1922".

David Bowie purchased work by Bomberg and kept it in his private collection, part of which was sold at auction after Bowie's death in 2016.

In 2017, the Pallant House Gallery in Chichester mounted a major exhibition of Bomberg's work curated in partnership with the Ben Uri Gallery & Museum of St John's Wood, London.

== References in fiction ==
In Restless, William Boyd's 2006 novel, there is a reference to a portrait by Bomberg of one of the book's major (fictional) characters. The painting is said to occupy a place in the National Portrait Gallery in London. In A Palestine Affair, a 2003 novel by Jonathan Wilson, the character "Mike Bloomberg" is loosely based on Bomberg's life, as acknowledged by the author: "Richard Cork's 'David Bomberg' [was] ... of inestimable value to me in constructing this fiction". Glyn Hughes's novel, Roth (Simon & Schuster, London, 1992) – its leading character, a London Jewish painter, its cover carrying a reproduction of one of Bomberg's Cyprus landscapes, is also loosely based on the author's reflections on Bomberg.
