= List of artists associated with The London Group =

This is a list of artists associated with The London Group:

- Eileen Agar
- Craigie Aitchison
- Michael Andrews
- Ray Atkins
- Frank Auerbach
- Walter Bayes
- Philippa Beale
- Vanessa Bell
- John Bellany
- James Bolivar Manson
- David Bomberg
- Frank Bowling
- Horace Brodzky
- Edward Burra
- Jack Butler Yeats
- William Coldstream
- Frank Coombs
- John Copnall
- Alan Davie
- Joan Day (painter)
- Roy De Maistre
- Stanislawa de Karlowska
- Jessica Dismorr
- Frank Dobson
- Ruth Doggett
- Alan Durst
- Jacob Epstein
- Mary Fedden
- Andrew Forge
- Peter de Francia
- Stanisław Frenkiel
- Elisabeth Frink
- Terry Frost
- Roger Fry
- Henri Gaudier-Brzeska
- Mark Gertler
- Jean Gibson
- Harold Gilman
- Tricia Gillman
- Jules de Goede
- Spencer Gore
- Henryk Gotlib
- Duncan Grant
- Anthony Green
- Vaughan Grylls
- Nina Hamnett
- Barbara Hepworth
- Gertrude Hermes
- Patrick Heron
- Ivon Hitchens
- David Hockney
- Anna Hope Hudson
- Albert Irvin
- Morris Kestelman
- Robin Klassnik
- Leon Kossoff
- Therese Lessore
- Kit Lewis
- Wyndham Lewis
- Juliette Losq
- Peter Lowe (artist)
- L.S. Lowry
- Edward McKnight Kauffer
- Dorothy Mead
- Bernard Meninsky
- Gustav Metzger
- John Minton
- Kate Montgomery
- Henry Moore
- John Nash
- Paul Nash
- Janet Nathan
- Micheál OʼConnell / Mocksim
- Eugene Palmer
- Victor Pasmore
- John Piper
- Lucien Pissarro
- Robert Polhill Bevan
- Mary Potter
- C. R. W. Nevinson
- J. W. Power
- Paula Rego
- Ceri Richards
- William Roberts
- Ethel Sands
- Walter Sickert
- Stanley Simmonds
- John Skeaping
- Matthew Smith
- Ruskin Spear
- Stanley Spencer
- Cecil Stephenson
- Philip Sutton
- Franciszka Themerson
- Harry Thubron
- John Tunnard
- Euan Uglow
- Allan Walton
- Edward Wadsworth
- Carel Weight
- Anthony Whishaw
- David Whitaker (artist)
- Bryan Wynter
- Marek Zulawski
