= List of presidents of The London Group =

This is a list of presidents of The London Group.

President	Election	Served	Comment
Harold Gilman	1913	1914_1918	Gilman was a founding member.
Robert Bevan	1913	1918_1921	Bevan was a founding member and the Treasurer until 1919; He was a Caretaker President.
Bernard Adeney	1913	1921_1923	Adeney was a founding member.
Frank Dobson	1922	1924_1926	
Rupert Lee	1922	1926_1936	
Harold Sandys Williamson	1933	1937_1943	Chairman. He was also known as H.S. Williamson.
Elliott Seabrooke	1920	1943_1948	Assumed Presidency during World War II.
Ruskin Spear	1940–43	1948_1951	
John Dodgson	1947	1951_1952	
Claude Rogers	1938	1952_1966	
Andrew Forge	1960	1966_1971	
Dorothy Mead	1960	1971_1973	First woman President
Neville Boden	1964	1973_1977	
Peter Donnelly	1973	1977_1979	
Stan Smith	1975	1979_1993	1979–81 period of reorganisation, evidence unclear
Dennis Creffield	1962	1983	He was president for only 24 hours.
Adrian Bartlett	1981	1993_1995	
Philippa Beale	1977	1995_1998	
Matthew Kolakowski	1990	1998_2000	
Peter Clossick	1999	2000_2005	
Philip Crozier	2001	2005_2007	
Susan Haire	2004	2007_2021	Longest serving president
Amanda Loomes	2008	2021_2024	
Paul Bonomini	2020	2024_	
