= Joan Day =

British artist

Joan Day (2 June 1911 – January 2004) was a British painter, muralist, and educator known for her expressive explorations of landscape, mythology, and natural form. A member of The London Group, Day's career spanned over six decades and reflected a distinctive evolution from representational to abstract and semi-abstract forms, often infused with ecological and symbolic themes. Her work is characterised by sensitivity to natural phenomena and a unique use of transparency and layered glazing. She was based in Northern Ireland, Yorkshire, and later Grantchester, where she continued to teach and paint into her 90s.

== Early life and education ==
Joan Day was born in Belfast, Northern Ireland, the third daughter of John and Elsa Loewenthal. Her family background combined German-Jewish and French heritage, with roots in Hamburg linen trading and French lace-making. Educated at Richmond Lodge School, she initially won a scholarship to study modern languages at Bedford College, London, but chose instead to pursue art. She trained at Chelsea Polytechnic and the Westminster School of Art, where she studied under the influential painter Mark Gertler, a prominent figure in British modernism known for his expressive figuration and bold colour use.

== Career ==
In 1937, Day began exhibiting with The London Group, alongside artists such as Mervyn Peake, Graham Sutherland, Victor Pasmore, and John Piper. In 1938, she was commissioned to paint a mural for the Northern Ireland pavilion at the Empire Exhibition in Glasgow. The work, which featured Art Deco influences and vibrant energy, garnered attention in The Daily Telegraph, The Illustrated London News, and Tatler. This period marked the beginning of her public artistic recognition.

During the 1940s, she exhibited regularly in Belfast and London, producing landscapes and wartime scenes such as Carryduff Quarry, Mounted Police, and Mourne Mountains. Her work from this period was largely representational, focusing on the Northern Irish coastline and industrial scenes. During World War II, she helped organize exhibitions at Queen's University Belfast to sustain cultural engagement during wartime.

After marrying Tom Day, a pathology demonstrator at Cambridge, she continued to paint while raising her children. In 1946, she completed nursery mural designs for the Northern Ireland Ministry of Education and produced several portraits of her family.

== Later work and style ==
In 1950, the Day family moved to Ilkley, Yorkshire. Joan Day chaired the Ilkley Art Club and taught classes throughout the 1950s and 1960s. Inspired by the local landscape, she began creating abstract works based on microscopic plant and animal forms. In the 1970s, her Yorkshire Abbeys series, painted in glazes, was acquired by St Hilda's College, Oxford.

In 1971, she relocated to Grantchester, where she produced semi-abstract works inspired by nature, mythology, and the Cambridgeshire landscape. Recurring motifs in her work included birds, swans, and mythological figures such as Icarus. Her technique combined layering, transparency, and geometric structure, often using a glazing method that gave her paintings luminosity and depth. These formal qualities evoked both the clarity and elusiveness of natural forces, offering a contemplative and often mystical tone.

== Teaching and legacy ==
From the 1970s until her death, Day taught regular art classes at her Grantchester studio, Chapel House. Her work is noted for its sensitivity to natural forms and its resistance to academic over-interpretation. She encouraged her students to appreciate pattern, intuition, and the emotional force of color and shape.

Day's paintings span nearly every major movement of the 20th century, synthesizing them into a personal visual language. Her works continue to be appreciated for their aesthetic clarity and philosophical depth.

== Commemoration ==
=== Joan Day Artist Bursary ===
The Joan Day Artist Bursary is an annual award presented by the South Square Centre in Bradford to support emerging painters based in the West Yorkshire region. Established in memory of Joan Day, who lived and worked in the area, the bursary aims to nurture artistic development at a critical stage in an artist's career.

Applicants must be emerging artists residing in West Yorkshire and working with paint. The award typically includes financial support—such as a £1000 grant—and the opportunity to present a solo exhibition at the South Square Centre gallery. Recipients are selected based on their application, which must demonstrate both a commitment to painting and significant potential for artistic growth.

Past recipients have included Sophie Victoria Elliott and Jess Kidd, who used the bursary to create new work and stage their first solo exhibitions. The award reflects Joan Day's legacy of artistic mentorship and her commitment to supporting the next generation of painters.

== Selected works ==
- A selection of Joan Day's paintings can be viewed on Art UK, including Swans in Flight and Interior with Swan, which illustrate her recurring fascination with bird imagery and the interplay between figure and space.
- A representative painting, Swans (oil on canvas), can be viewed via MutualArt.com. Though the image is under copyright, it demonstrates Day's characteristic use of fluid form, transparency, and natural symbolism. It serves as a compelling example of her mature style.

== Sources ==
- Fisher, Thelma (ed.). Joan Elsa Day 1911–2004. Grantchester: The Folly Press, ISBN 0-9544818-1-X (out of print)
- In the Studio of Joan Day
- Private biography written by Elizabeth Day, 2004
