= Schilsky =

Schilsky is a surname. Notable people with the surname include:

- Friedrich Julius Schilsky (1848–1912), German entomologist
- Eric Schilsky (1898–1974), British sculptor
