= Victorine Foot =

British artist and wartime camoufleur (1920-2000

Victorine Anne Foot
- Born: 1 May 1920; Pembury, Kent
- Died: 2000 (aged 79–80)
- Education: Central School of Art; Chelsea School of Art; Edinburgh College of Art
- Known for: Painting
- Spouse: Eric Schilsky

Victorine Anne Foot SSA (1 May 1920 – 2000) was a British artist who worked in oils, watercolours and pastels. Foot is best known for her work during World War II on military camouflage and for her post-war career as an artist and teacher in Scotland.

== Early life ==
Foot was born in Knowles Bank near Pembury in Kent and studied at the Central School of Art in London between 1938 and 1941.

== World War Two ==
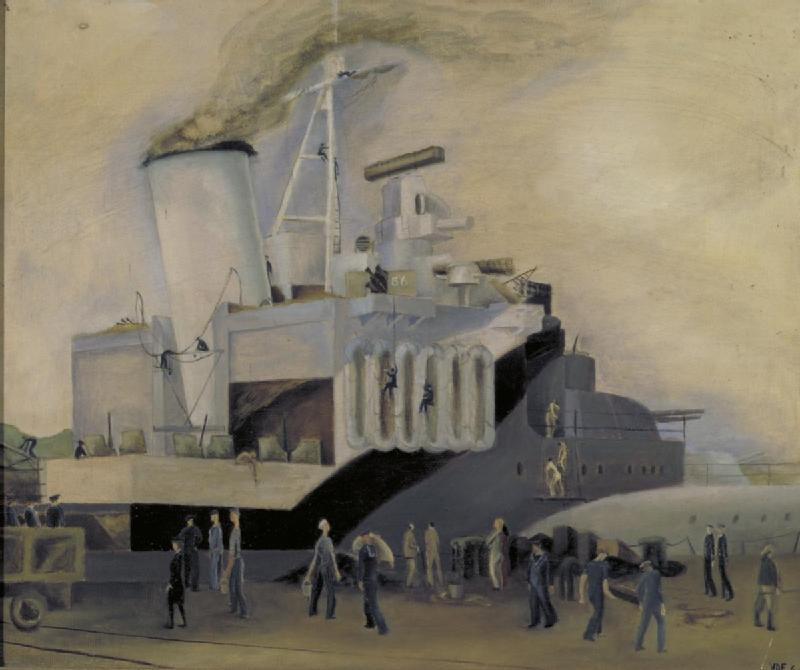
Camouflaging a Cruiser in Dock (1943) (Art. IWM LD 3016)

After the war began, the Central School of Art was evacuated to Northampton in 1941 and Foot gave up her studies to take a job as a Junior Technical Assistant in the Naval Section of the Directorate of Camouflage based in Leamington Spa. Her duties included painting camouflage designs onto models of ships. The models were all based on real ships; if the real ship was sunk or lost the model was retired from further use.

Whilst at the Camouflage Directorate, Foot drew and painted her colleagues at work, both at Leamington Spa and at the docks where they painted their camouflage schemes onto ships. She submitted some of this work to the War Artists' Advisory Committee and had one painting, Camouflaging a Cruiser in Dock, purchased by the Committee in June 1943.

== Post-war career ==
When the war ended, Foot returned to her art studies. She studied at the Chelsea School of Art for a short time before she moved to Edinburgh, where she married Eric Schilsky, an artist whom she had first met at the Camouflage Unit. Schilsky was head of the School of Sculpture at Edinburgh College of Art and Foot enrolled there, gaining her Diploma in 1949. In 1949 Foot had her first solo exhibition at the Institute Francais in Edinburgh. She went on to exhibit with the New English Art Club, the London Group, at the Royal Academy and the Royal Scottish Academy. The critic Jack Beddington included Foot as one of the subjects in his 1957 book Young Artists of Promise. Foot also taught for periods of time, at the Edinburgh College of Art in 1950 and 1951, and at Oxenfoord Castle School, in Midlothian, throughout the 1960s and 1970s.

In 1994 Foot donated her sketches from Leamington Spa to the Imperial War Museum. Works by Foot are also held by Aberdeen Art Gallery and the Scottish Arts Council.
