= Elizabeth Fraser (disambiguation) =

Elizabeth Fraser (born 1963) is a Scottish singer, songwriter and musician.

Elizabeth Fraser may also refer to:

- Elisabeth Fraser (1920–2005), American actress
- Elizabeth Fraser (swimmer) (born 1941), Australian swimmer
- Elizabeth Bertha Fraser (1914–2006), British artist
- Liz Fraser (1930–2018), British actress
