= Mary Godwin =

Mary Godwin may refer to:

- Mary Godwin (artist) (1887–1960), British artist
- Mary Jane Godwin (1768–1841), English author, publisher, and bookseller
- Mary Wollstonecraft (1759–1797), English writer, philosopher, and advocate of women's rights; wife of journalist William Godwin
- Mary Shelley (1797–1851), née Godwin, English novelist; daughter of William Godwin and Mary Wollstonecraft; wife of poet Percy Bysshe Shelley
