= David Whitaker =

David Whitaker may refer to:

- Diamond Dave Whitaker (1937–2026), American activist
- David Whitaker (artist) (1938–2007), British abstract artist and teacher
- David Whitaker (screenwriter) (1928–1980), English story editor of the Doctor Who series
- David Whitaker (composer) (1931–2012), English composer, songwriter, arranger, and conductor
- David Whitaker (field hockey) (born 1948), Great Britain hockey coach in 1984 Summer Olympics
- David Whitaker (publisher) (died 2021), British publisher and magazine editor
- David Whitaker (politician) (born 1961), member of the Arkansas House of Representatives

== See also ==
- David Whittaker (disambiguation)
