= David Whittaker =

David Whittaker may refer to:

- David Whittaker (cricketer) (1857–1901), English cricketer
- David Whittaker (video game composer) (born 1957), British video game composer
- David A. Whittaker (born 1952), American sound editor

== See also ==
- David Whitaker (disambiguation)
