= Wendela Boreel =

American-Dutch artist

Wendela Boreel (1895–1985) was a British artist noted for her gouache painting method and intaglio works. She was a student of Walter Sickert.

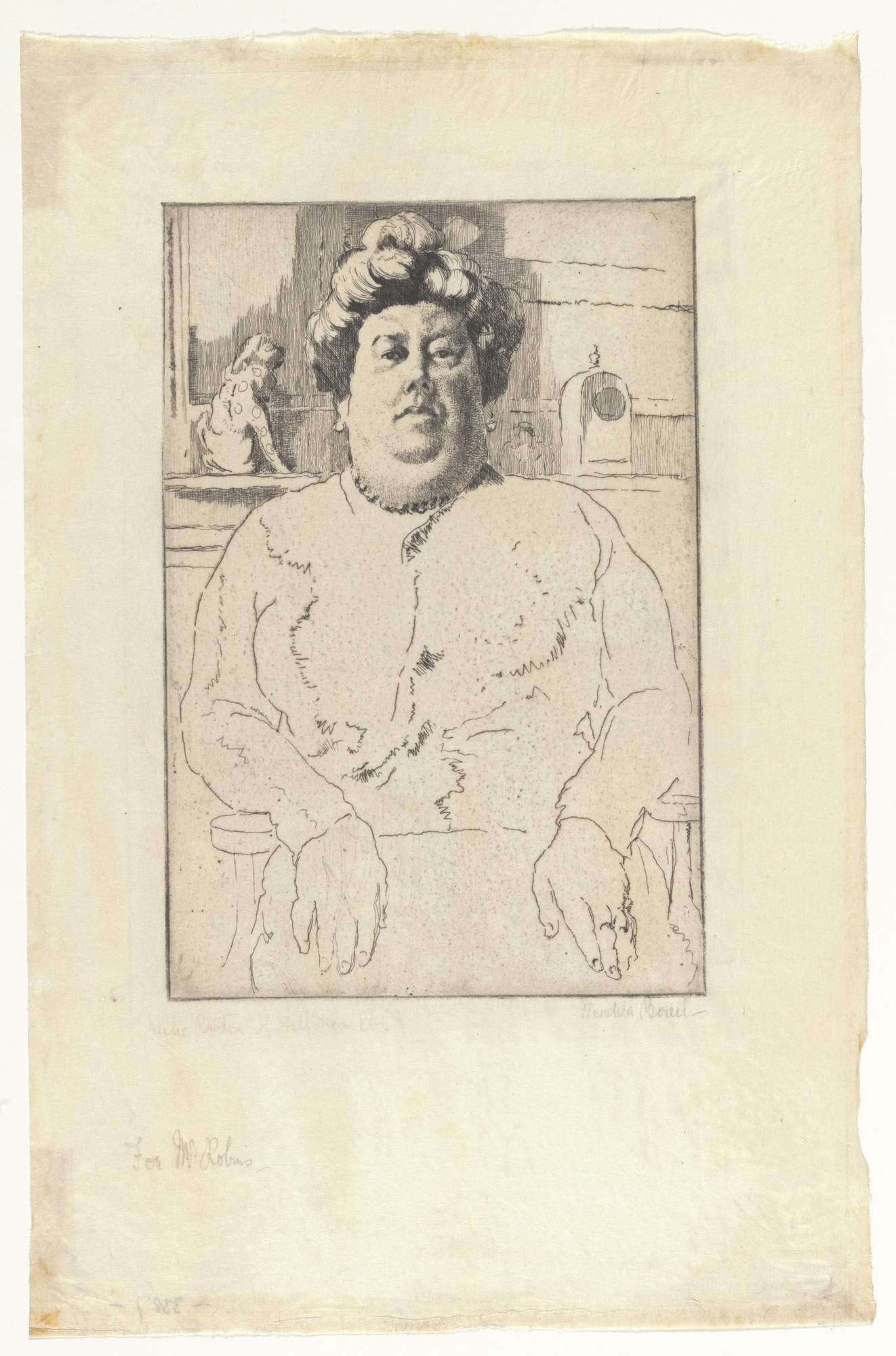
Nellie Burton, by Wendela Boreel

== Training and early career ==
The daughter of a Dutch diplomat, Robert John Ralph Boreel, jhr, and an American mother, Edith Margaret (née Ives), Edith Wendela Boreel was born in Pau, Basses-Pyrénées, France, on March 18, 1896. Boreel grew up in England and attended the Slade School of Fine Art. Boreel's first interest at Slade was in drawing. She began attending evening classes at the Westminster Technical Institute where she was discovered by Sickert. He gave her access to a studio in Mornington Crescent where she began painting.

Boreel's first solo exhibit was in 1919 at Walker's Gallery. She also held shows at the New English Art Club and as part of Frank Rutter’s Allied Artists’ Association and the London Group. However, her earliest successes were in etching and she was elected to the Royal Society of Etchers in 1923.

== Tite Street ==
Boreel and her parents lived on Tite Street and she became friends with Frank Schuster and met John Singer Sargent, James Abbott McNeill Whistler, Edward Elgar, Siegfried Sassoon, W. B. Yeats, Thomas Hardy, Roger Fry, and Glyn Philpot.

== "The Hut" ==
In 1919 Frank Schuster introduced Boreel to Leslie Wylde (nicknamed 'Anzie'), an army officer from New Zealand, who had lost a leg during the Gallipoli Campaign. Boreel and Wylde married in 1924 and Schuster invited them to live in "The Hut", his country estate in Bray, Berkshire. Siegfried Sassoon described Boreel as "delightful" and said she was "the only serious element" at Bray. Boreel's etching of Sassoon is held at the Art Gallery of New South Wales. When Schuster died in 1927 he left the estate to Wylde and Boreel.

== Later years ==
Wylde died in 1935 and Boreel moved to France. She escaped to the United States with her son at the onset of World War Two. She returned to France after the war. She died on May 19, 1984 at Castelnau-le-Lez, Hérault, France.
