= Kit Lewis =

British painter

Kathleen Margaret "Kit" Lewis (27 September 1911 – 1998) was a British painter, a member of The London Group.

== Early life and education ==
The second daughter of Henry Bryan Godfrey Godfrey-Faussett-Osborne and Margaret Sydney Bourns, she was born Kathleen Margaret Godfrey-Faussett-Osborne in Lichfield, Staffordshire. Her father was a probate officer and civil servant. She studied at the Chelsea College of Art under Graham Sutherland.

== Career ==
Lewis joined The London Group in 1948. In 1953, she had her first solo show at the Leicester Galleries and continued to show there on a frequent basis.

== Personal life ==
On 20 May 1940, she married Edward Morland Lewis, an artist who died in North Africa in 1943 while employed as a war artist. In 1954, she married Sir James Maude Richards, an architectural writer. The couple had one son Alexander, who died in 1972 age only sixteen, having been hit by a car.
