= Mary Godwin (artist) =

British artist (1887-1960)

- Born: 1887; Stoke Bishop, Bristol
- Died: 1960 (aged 72–73)
- Known for: Oil painter, water colourist and etcher
- Movement: The London Group

Mary Godwin (1887–1960) was a British oil painter, water colourist and etcher, who often chose landscapes, interiors, and figures as subjects. She studied at the Women’s Department of King’s College with John Byam Shaw, and at Westminster Technical Institute with Walter Sickert and Harold Gilman. She was influenced by the Camden Town Group, and joined its successor, The London Group (LG) in 1914.

Her early works were considered radical, challenging the traditionalism of the Royal Academy of Arts. In spite of severe criticism, she persisted in establishing herself as a modernist artist. By the 1920s and 1930s she was widely recognized for the quality of her work. She showed her works consistently from 1914 to 1960, a sustained career of almost half a century. She is recognized as an important contributor to the London Group.

== Life ==
Emily Mary Godwin was born at Stoke Bishop, a suburb of Bristol, in 1887. From 1908 to 1910 Mary Godwin studied in London with John Byam Shaw, who taught at The Women’s Department of King’s College. From 1911 to 1914 Godwin studied at the Westminster School of Art under Walter Sickert. In 1915 she studied with Harold Gilman, who influenced her use of colour.

Known initially as Miss E. M. Godwin, Mary Godwin soon dropped her first name, perhaps because another Chelsea artist was already exhibiting as E. Godwin. Miss L. C. Godwin, possibly a sister of Mary Godwin, was also an artist and lived at Stoke Bishop, Bristol before moving to Cornwall in the 1920s. Mary Godwin lived most of her life in London, at addresses including 225, 253, and 68 Hampstead Road. She also painted in the West Country, France and Madeira, Portugal.

== Career ==
Mary Godwin is first listed as exhibiting at the New English Art Club (NEAC) and the London Salon of the Allied Artists Association (AAA) in 1913. She showed her works consistently in The London Group's exhibitions from 1914 to 1960. In addition to the LG, NEAC and AAA, her works appeared at the Bloomsbury Gallery, the Chenil Gallery, the Goupil Gallery, the Manchester City Art Gallery, the National Portrait Society, and even the Royal Academy.

Harold Gilman died in 1919, after only a short time at the Westminster School of Art, but by then he had inspired a loyal group of followers, including Mary Godwin, Ruth Doggett, and Marjorie Sherlock, who carried on with his approach into the 1920s and 1930s.

Thirty-three of Godwin's paintings were displayed in a solo show at the Leger Galleries in London as of January 1936, including The Bay, The Villa, and English Bay, Vancouver. An illustration of The Bay was included in the January 1st issue of Apollo.

Godwin's painting A Back-Room in Somerstown is featured on the back cover of Jane Johnson's Works exhibited at the Royal Society of British Artists, 1824-1893 and the New English Art Club, 1888-1917 : an Antique Collectors' Club research project (c1975).

== Critical reception ==
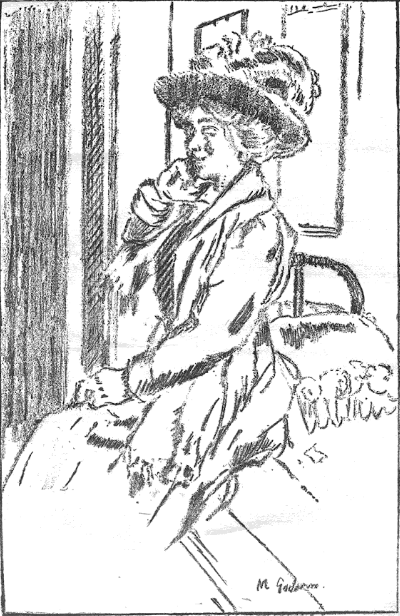
Sketch of "Ethel" by Mary Godwin, 1914

Many of Mary Godwin's early works were regarded as radical. With others of The London Group, she was seen as challenging the Royal Academy of Arts which was viewed as traditionalist.

In 1914, Walter Sickert presented M. Godwin's sketch "Ethel: A Modern Drawing" as an exemplar in his series of "Modern drawings" in the magazine The New Age. Godwin's painting A Back-Room in Somerstown was published in The Sunday Times in 1914. The Queen magazine complimented her "subtleties of light and colour" in 1915.

Others were considerably less complimentary to the modernism of The London Group. The Connoisseur reviewed the third exhibition of the London Group in 1916 and concluded that it contained "several paintings and drawings which came within the category of art, and many others which could only be regarded as pieces of foolishness." Mary Godwin was one of four artists individually mentioned, as was Sylvia Gosse.

"Much the same comment [perfectly intelligible paintings coarsely executed in exaggerated colours] might [sic] Miss Mary Godwin's Bedroom and Fish. This artist, if she got rid of her mannerisms, would be capable of good work, for her draughtsmanship, though expressed with wilful slovenliness, is well informed, and the Fish revealed a feeling for colour which even its crude handling did not wholly conceal."

By 1936, the radicalism of Mary Godwin's work was no longer being emphasized and the quality of her work was more recognized. The Times described the paintings in her solo show at the Leger Galleries as "so sedate in feeling and so completely realised in execution". A reviewer in February's Apollo noted her "undoubted capacity". The Times reviewer noted the influences of Walter Sickert and Charles Ginner, but credited Godwin with "her own taste in colour". The Apollo reviewer also compared her work approvingly to that of Charles Ginner, noting an "unconscious affinity" in their use of colour and choice of subject.

As of 1940, Godwin's work was shown at the Royal Academy. Her Flower-women of Madeira was number 386 in the 1940 catalogue.

Godwin continued to paint and to exhibit until her death in 1960, throughout a career that produced almost half a century of sustained work. Her achievements are in strong contrast to the social expectations of her youth. In 1913, many of Sickert’s pupils were women, but however talented they might be, they were rarely taken seriously as artists. They were expected to marry rather than have lasting careers, and their works were less likely to be featured in solo exhibitions or acquired by public galleries. A century later, critics are reassessing Godwin's work and that of other British women artists, recognizing the importance of such women’s artistic achievements and the transformation in gender roles that occurred during her lifetime.

"With examples of the principal British movements including the post-Impressionist groups, Camden Town and Bloomsbury, the exhibition traces the transformation of British art in this era of Crisis. Mary Godwin’s vivid use of colour is expressively brought to bear on a rough seascape. Showing the radical influence of her teacher, Harold Gilman, this work exemplifies her important contribution to the London Group."

== Cultural references ==
Godwin's painting A Back Room in Somers Town provides the title for a mystery by John Malcolm. Paintings by Mary Godwin and Walter Sickert are important to the plot of the book.
