= Elizabeth Bertha Fraser =

British artist (1914–2006)

- Born: Bertha Marks; 3 December 1914; Teddington, Surrey, England
- Died: 13 May 2006 (aged 91); London, England
- Education: Birmingham School of Art; Central School of Arts and Crafts; Westminster School of Art; Edinburgh College of Art
- Known for: Sculpture

Elizabeth Bertha Fraser (née Marks; 3 December 1914 – 13 May 2006) was a British artist known for her oil paintings and portrait sculptures.

== Biography ==
Fraser was born in Teddington, Surrey on 3 December 1914. She studied at the Birmingham School of Art, moved to the Central School of Arts and Crafts in London and then to the Westminster School of Art before finishing her studies at the Edinburgh College of Art where she studied under Eric Schilsky.

Fraser painted in oils and created portrait sculptures and reliefs in a variety of materials, including wax, plaster and bronze. As well as having solo exhibitions in both London and Edinburgh, Fraser was a member of, and exhibited regularly with, the Society of Portrait Sculptors and also showed works at the Royal Academy.

Fraser died in London on 13 May 2006, at the age of 91.
