= Robert Tollast =

British painter (1915–2008)

- Born: Robert Malcolm Priestly Tollast; 15 September 1915; London, England
- Died: 5 February 2008 (aged 92); Wiltshire, England
- Occupation: Painter
- Known for: Portrait painting

Robert Tollast (né Robert Malcolm Priestly Tollast; 1915–2008), was a British painter. He was a court painter for the House of Habsburg.

== Biography ==
Robert Malcolm Priestly Tollast was born on 15 September 1915 in Wandsworth, London. He studied Fine Arts at the Westminster School of Art.

During World War II, he was commissioned in the Intelligence Corps and joined the diplomatic service as an Attaché de Presse in the British embassies of Baghdad and Cairo. He resigned in 1948 to become a full-time portrait painter and in 1949 had his first one-man show in London and exhibited at the Royal Academy.

A period of global travel was followed by ten years painting in the United States (New York and Washington D.C.) His exhibition at the Washington gallery was opened by the then British Ambassador, the Earl of Cromer, formerly Governor of the Bank of England. In the early 1960s, he spent time in Cambridge doing portraits of college luminaries and also for local families. After he returned to England in 1976, Tollast divided his time among Switzerland, France (Paris) and Italy (Milan and Florence) and Austria (Vienna) with occasional visits to Germany.

During long visits to South Africa, he painted three generations of the Oppenheimer family, among other prominent figures in industry. His work was exhibited in 1959 in the Africana Museum (now MuseuMAfricA) in Newtown, Johannesburg.

The list of Tollast's most interesting portrait commissions includes clients internationally prominent in the arts, sciences, industry and politics, of which one of the most notable is that of Sir Winston Churchill. This was the last official portrait, of which the sitter — notoriously difficult over portraits of himself — went on record to express his approval.

Tollast's recent commission was to paint, in oil, all the partners of the partners of the Geneva private bank Lombard Odier & Cie. He also works in watercolour and pastel and is a notably successful painter of children.

At the time of his death, Tollast was royal court painter to the Habsburg family of Austria. His work is included in museum collection at the National Portrait Gallery in London.
