= Anthony Whishaw =

English artist (born 1930)

Anthony Whishaw RA
- Born: 1930; London, England
- Education: Chelsea School of Arts (1952); Royal College of Art (1955)
- Occupation: Artist
- Years active: 1952–present

Anthony Whishaw RA (born 1930) is an English artist and member of the Royal Academy. He is also a member of The London Group.

He was married to the sculptor Jean Gibson until her death in 1991.

== Education ==
Whishaw attended Tonbridge School in Kent and went on to study at the Chelsea School of Art (1948–52) and the Royal College of Art (1952–55). At the latter, in 1955, he graduated with first class honours, and was awarded the Drawing Prize. He is also a recipient of the RCA Travelling scholarship, Abbey Minor Scholarship and Spanish Government Scholarship, where he painted Corrida.

== Work and exhibitions ==
Whishaw's first solo exhibition was held at the Libreria Abril, Madrid in 1956. Subsequently, he had regular exhibitions at Roland, Browse and Delbanco, London, throughout the 1960s and went on to have numerous solo shows throughout the UK at venues including the ICA, London (1971), the Oxford Gallery, Oxford (1978), Royal Academy of Arts (1986, 1987, 2020), Kettle's Yard, Cambridge (1982) and Barbican Centre (1994). He also exhibited in many key group exhibitions from 1952, and has participated regularly in the Whitechapel Open, the Hayward Annual, and the John Moores Painting Prize.
Whishaw claims no association with any particular art movement, stating instead that "each painting and work on paper makes its own separate demands".

== Memberships ==
In 1989 Whishaw was elected to The London Group. In 1980 he was elected Associate of the Royal Academy, and in 1989 he became a Royal Academician. He was also elected as an honorary member of the Royal West of England Academy in 1992.

== Awards ==
(source)

- Royal College of Art Drawing Prize (1954)
- Perth International Drawing Biennale Prize (1973)
- South East Arts Association Painting Prize (1975)
- Arts Council of Great Britain Award (1978)
- Greater London Council Painting Prize (1981)
- Abbey Premier Scholarship (1982)
- John Moores Minor Painting Prize (1982)
- Lorne Scholarship (1982-3)
- Hunting Group National Art Competition (1986) (Joint winner)
- Korn Ferry Carre Oban International Picture of the Year (1996)
