= William Ratcliffe (artist) =

English painter

William Ratcliffe (6 October 1870 – January 1955) was an English painter who was one of the Camden Town Group of artists in early twentieth-century England. Although he never achieved the fame of other members of the Group, such as his friend and mentor Harold Gilman, he remained a full-time artist throughout his life, relying on the support of friends and family.

== Early life and education ==
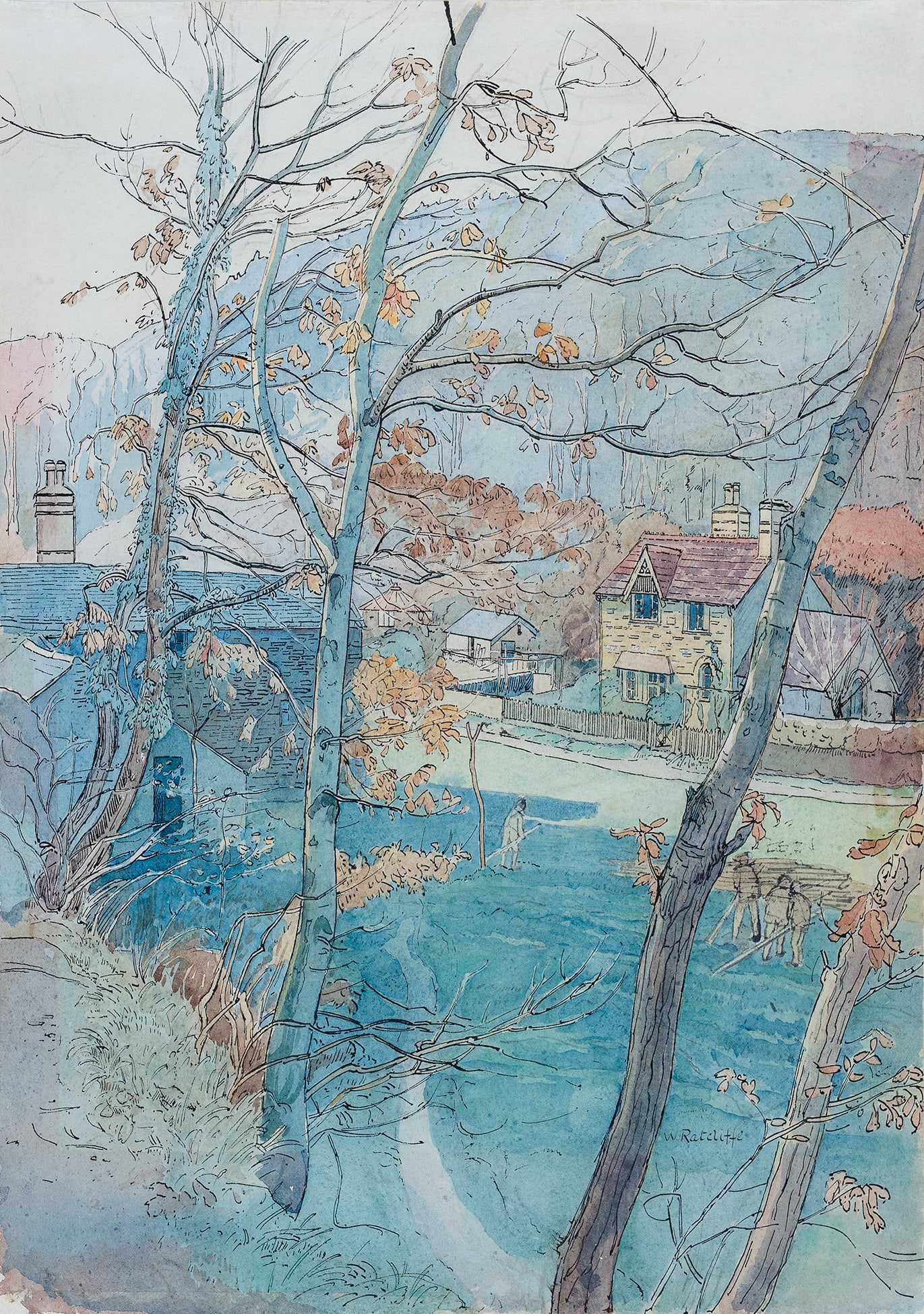
Village View Through Winter Trees (1920)

William Whitehead Ratcliffe was born on 6 October 1870 in the village of Clenchwarton, near King's Lynn (Norfolk, UK), the youngest of four children. His father, Zachariah, was a draper's assistant.

The family moved to Gorton, near Manchester, while Ratcliffe was still young. After leaving school and while working as a clerk for a cotton merchant, he attended evening classes at the Manchester School of Art, whose director of design at the time was Walter Crane, and learned wallpaper design.

== Career ==
By 1901, Ratcliffe was working for the Wallpaper Manufacturers Combine. Shortly afterwards, his work took him to London, where he discovered the Garden City movement, which drew him to Letchworth Garden City, where he moved in 1906.

By 1907, Ratcliffe was living in Westholm, close to Stanley Parker, brother of the Garden City architect Richard Barry Parker. In 1908, they were joined by Harold Gilman and his wife Grace, forming a small artistic clique. Under Gilman's influence and encouragement, Ratcliffe turned his back on commercial art and illustration, devoting the rest of his life to fine art.

== Death ==
Ratcliffe died of heart failure and arteriosclerosis in January 1955. His body was cremated at Golders Green Crematorium and the ashes dispersed.

== Sources ==
- Rosamond Allwood (2011). William Ratcliffe: paintings, prints and drawings. Letchworth Garden City: North Hertfordshire District Council. p. 102. ISBN 9780955411663.
- Heather Birchall, Helena Bonett and Ysanne Holt, 'William Ratcliffe 1870–1955', artist biography, February 2011, in Helena Bonett, Ysanne Holt, Jennifer Mundy (eds.), The Camden Town Group in Context, Tate, May 2012, http://www.tate.org.uk/art/research-publications/camden-town-group/william-ratcliffe-r1105352
