= James Maude Richards =

English architectural writer

Sir James Richards
- Born: James Maude Richards; 13 August 1907; Carshalton, Surrey, England
- Died: 27 April 1992 (aged 84); Fulham, London, England

Sir James Maude Richards, CBE FRIBA (13 August 1907 – 27 April 1992) was a British architectural writer.

== Early life and education ==
James Maude Richards was born in 1907, at Ladypath, Park Lane, Carshalton, Surrey. His father, Louis Saurin Richards, was a solicitor, and his mother, Lucy Denes (née Clarence), was born in Ceylon, now Sri Lanka. Educated at Gresham's School, Holt, and Cambridge University, he trained as an architect at the Architectural Association.

== Career ==
He worked at J. Lyons & Co., assisting Oliver Percy Bernard, before being sent to work as an architectural assistant for the engineer, Owen Williams.

But his main career was as a writer on architecture. As well as publishing many books, he served as editor of the Architectural Review from 1937 to 1971, the longest period in office of any of its editors.

== Personal life ==
He had a short, unhappy marriage to artist Peggy Angus, with whom he had a daughter, Victoria, and a son Angus. The couple married in 1936 and divorced in 1948. In 1954, he married Kit Lewis, also an artist; the couple had one son.

He died in Fulham, London, on 27 April 1992.

== Major publications ==
- "Towards a Rational Aesthetic: An Examination of the Characteristics of Modern Design with Particular Reference to the Influence of the Machine," in Architectural Review 77 (1935): 211-18.
- High Street (Country Life, 1938) with illustrations by Eric Ravilious
- A Miniature History of the English House (Architectural Press, 1938) ISBN 0-85139-389-6
- An Introduction to Modern Architecture (Penguin Books, 1940, revised 1953 and 1963) ISBN 0-14-020061-4
- The Castles on the Ground (Architectural Press, 1946), 2nd edn with subtitle The Anatomy of Suburbia (John Murray, 1973) ISBN 0-7195-2908-5
- Functional Tradition in Early Industrial Buildings (Architectural Press, 1958) ISBN 0-85139-226-1
- "Stockholm's New Commercial Centre," in Architectural Review 130 (August 1961): 104-14.
- Guide to Finnish Architecture (1966)
- The Anti-rationalists (University of Toronto Press, 1973) (ed. with Nikolaus Pevsner) ISBN 0-85139-005-6
- The Professions: Architecture (David & Charles, 1974) ISBN 0-7153-6422-7
- Provision for the Arts in the Republic of Ireland (Gulbenkian Foundation, 1976) ISBN 0-903319-05-5
- Who's Who in Architecture from 1400 to the Present Day (Weidenfeld & Nicolson, 1977) ISBN 0-297-77283-X
- Eight Hundred Years of Finnish Architecture (David & Charles, 1978) ISBN 0-7153-7512-1
- Memoirs of an Unjust Fella (Weidenfeld & Nicolson, 1980) ISBN 0-297-77767-X
- The National Trust Book of English Architecture (Weidenfeld & Nicolson, 1981) ISBN 0-297-77901-X
- "Marcel Breuer: 1902-81," in Architectural Review 170, no. 1014 (1981): 69-70.
- "Carl Ludwig Engel, Finland's Neo-Classical Master," in Architectural Review 171, no. 1021 (1982): 52-59.
- "Peter Reyner Banham," in Architectural Review 183, no. 1095 (1988): 9-10.

== Bibliography ==
- Yeomans, David (2001). Owen Williams. Thomas Telford. ISBN 978-0-7277-3018-3.
- Kelly, Jessica (2015). "Vulgar modernism: J.M. Richards, modernism, and the vernacular in British architecture," Architectural History, Vol.58, pp. 229–259
- Kelly, Jessica (2016). "To Fan the Ardour of the Layman: The Architectural Review, The MARS Group and the Cultivation of Middle Class Audiences for Modernism in Britain, 1933-1940," Journal of Design History, Vol.29(4), pp. 350–365
