= Leslie Wylde =

New Zealand army officer

Leslie Wylde (nicknamed 'Anzie') (1893–1935) was an ex-army officer from New Zealand, who, under the patronage of Frank Schuster, associated with a large group of leading English artists, composers and poets in the 1920s.

Wylde enlisted with the New Zealand Army in 1914 and saw action in the Gallipoli campaign where he lost a leg and was invalided to England. There, he met Schuster, who offered Wylde the hospitality of "The Hut", his country estate in Bray, Berkshire, where he befriended (among others) Siegfried Sassoon (who chronicled some of Wylde's activity), Edward Elgar, Robert Nichols and Glyn Philpot.

After spells abroad, in France and back in New Zealand, Wylde rejoined Schuster's circle, where he met artist Wendela Boreel, whom he married in 1924. He and Boreel moved into an extension of The Hut, renamed at Wylde's suggestion as "The Long White Cloud" (a translation of Aotearoa, the Māori name for New Zealand). When Schuster died in 1927 he left the estate to Wylde and Boreel. However, the couple began spending less time in Bray and more on the Cote d'Azur, where Wylde sailed his yacht, Quest II, and Boreel painted.

A son, James Paxton de Eglesfield Wylde, was born in 1927.

Wylde died suddenly in May 1935, at the age of 41.
