= Theo Brown =

English folklorist (1914–1993)

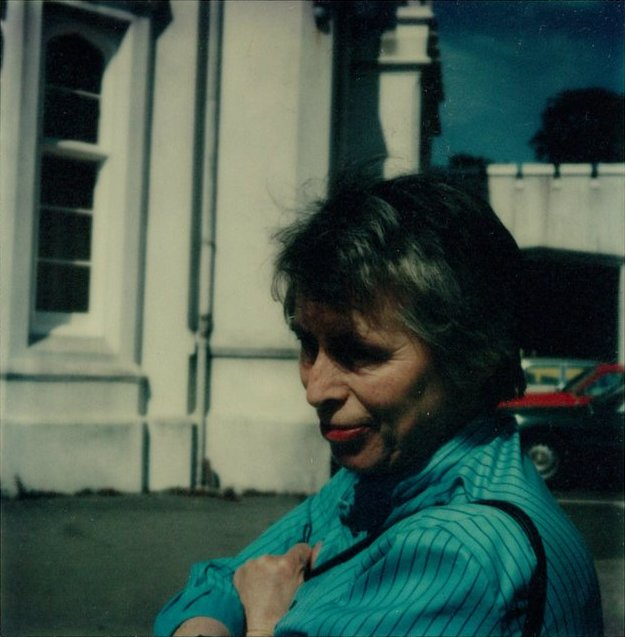
Theo Brown outside Exeter University library.

Theo Brown (16 December 1914 – 3 February 1993) was a British scholar of Devon folklore. She was lecturer in Comparative Religion at Exeter University.

== Biography ==
Theo Brown was born Jean Marion Pryce in London. Her mother died in childbirth. Her father – a scholar, who was later to become Keeper of Classical Antiquities at the British Museum – was unable to look after her, and put her into an orphanage. She was adopted by Dorothy Langford Brown, of Barton Hall, Kingskerswell, Devon, and renamed Theodora Brown.

Brown studied at Westminster School of Art, where she was taught by Mervyn Peake among others, and where she met her lifelong friend, Margaret Matcham. She joined the Kenn group of artists.

During the Second World War she joined the Women's Royal Naval Service but as her mother insisted she remain near to home, her time was spent in home defence duties. When joining the Wrens she had to produce a birth certificate, and so found out about her adoption – something which caused her much distress at the time.

"He continued to stare at me gravely, and somehow we found ourselves talking about death.
I believe you'd be interested in my book, Cumaean Gates: may I send you a copy?" he asked shyly, so we exchanged names and addresses ("I'm always known to my friends as 'JK'," he explained), then he continued brightly: "Really, you are just the sort of person who ought to join the Virgil Society; we have some wonderful people in it, and you don't need to know any Latin!" Now, it so happened that I was in a very depressed frame of mind at that time, the unpleasant mood where one is apt to belittle anyone who seems inclined to like one; so when he said. this, I had a sudden picture in my mind of a forlorn little group in a drawing room, joggled along by his enthusiasm. So, I said coldly "Oh! Are you the President?" He looked at me thoughtfully. "Well, no, I'm not. They wanted me to be President - wasn't it nice of them! - but I said we ought to have T. S. Eliot." "And did he accept?" I asked sceptically. "Oh, yes-he was delighted."
'I suppose no come-back has ever been so crushing, yet it was all said so lightly and gently it conveyed a world of information about the speaker, and of course I was convinced and charmed."

After the war, depressed and alone, she chanced to meet W. F. Jackson Knight in the station café of Exeter Central railway station. (This meeting is engagingly described in Jackson Knights Biography). He had a profound influence on her life thereafter, turning her to studies of Folklore and Comparative Religion, subjects in which she eventually became Lecturer at Exeter University. She was a significant member of the school of folklorists who were influenced by Jungian psychology, and believed that it was possible to identify in folklore the abiding archetypes of the collective unconscious. She gathered a large collection of stories and traditions, which are now deposited at the Devon and Exeter Institution, and her notes and unpublished work at the Exeter University Library.

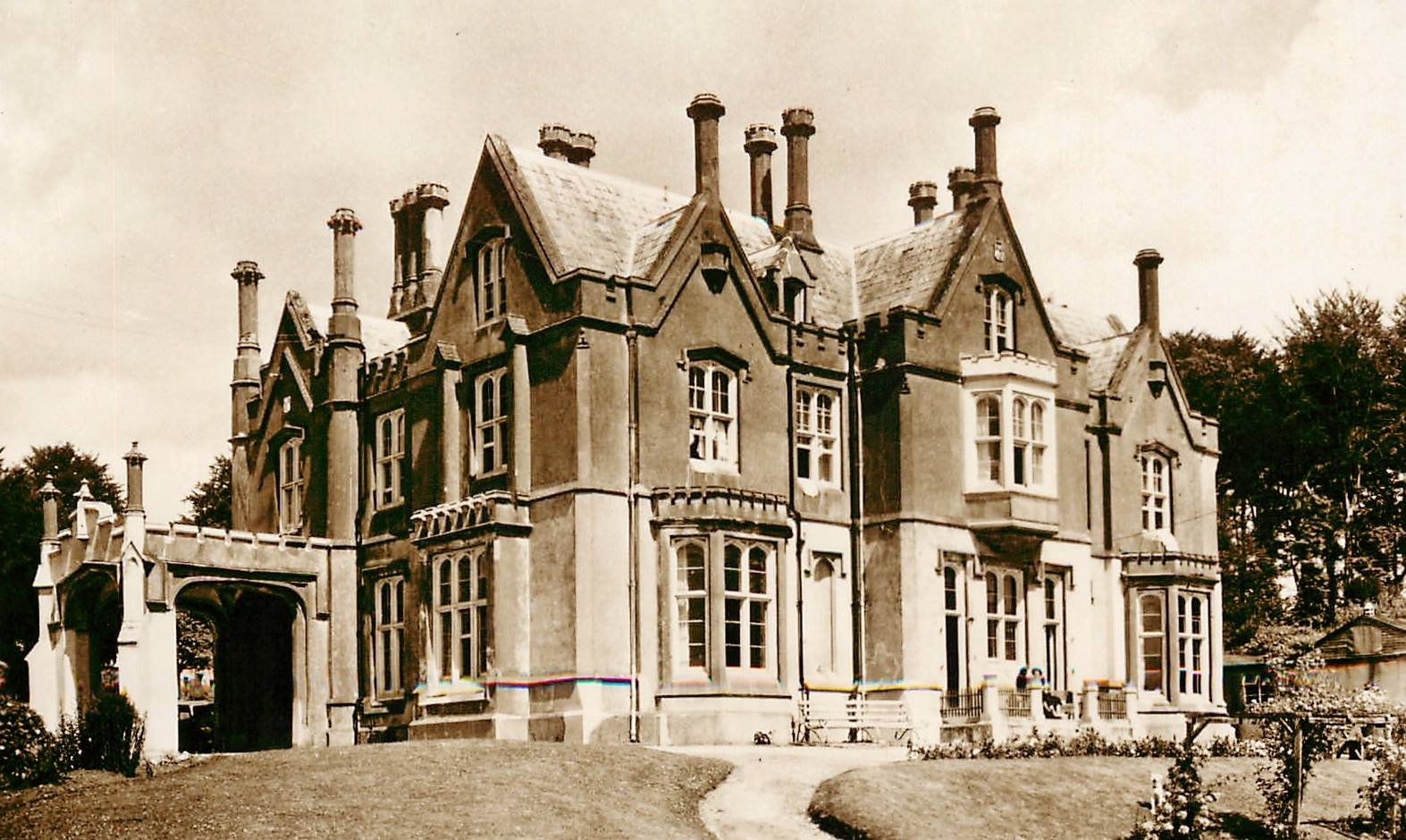
Barton Hall Devon 1870

Brown died in Exeter on 3 February 1993.

== Works ==
Selected publications

- 1954 The Dartmoor Legend of Mrs. Childe. Folklore 65, 103-9.
- 1958 The Black Dog. Folklore 69, 175-192.
- 1961 Tales of a Dartmoor Village. Some preliminary notes on the folklore of Postbridge. West Country Folklore No. 7. St. Peter Port, Guernsey.
- Reprinted from Transactions of the Devonshire Association XCIII (1961) 194-227].
- 1964 Living Images, Folklore 73, 25-40.
- 1968 (with Stephen Dewar) Ghostly Gold and Goblin Titles. West Country Folklore No. 2. St. Peter Port, Guernsey.
- 1970a Trojans in the West Country, West Country Folklore No. 4. St. Peter Port, Guernsey.
- 1970b Charming in Devon. Folklore 81, 19-47.
- 1975 West Country Entrances to the Underworld, in The Journey to the Other World, H.R.E. Davidson ed., Mistletoe Series No. 12. Folklore Society, London.
- 1978 The Black Dog in English Folklore,' in Animals in Folklore. J.R. Porter and W.M.S. Russell, eds. Mistletoe Series No. 9. Folklore Society, London.
- 1979 The Fate of the Dead: A Study in Folk Eschatology in the West Country after the Reformation. Mistletoe Series No. 12. Folklore Society, London.
- 1981 The Ghost of Old Mrs Leakey, in The Folklore of Ghosts, H.R.E. Davidson and W.M.S. Russell, eds., Mistletoe Series No. 15, Folklore Society, London.
- 1982 Devon Ghosts. Norwich.
