= Diana Gardner =

English wood engraver and writer (1913–1997)

Diana Gardner (1913–1997) was a writer, wood engraver and book illustrator who studied at the Westminster School of Art. Her first short story was published in Horizon in 1940, and later works included Halfway Down the Cliff (1946) and The Indian Woman (1954). In the 1960s she began work as a full-time painter working with ink and watercolours, and her work was exhibited.
