= Denise Broadley =

British artist

- Born: 8 December 1913; Isle of Sheppey, Kent
- Died: 2007 (aged 93–94); Suffolk, England
- Education: East Anglian School of Painting and Drawing; Ipswich School of Art; Westminster School of Art
- Known for: Painting

Denise Broadley (8 December 1913 – 2007) was a British painter and artist.

== Biography ==
Broadley was born on the Isle of Sheppey in Kent and studied at the Ipswich School of Art from 1932 to 1935 and at the Westminster School of Art in London between 1936 and 1939. Broadley also spent periods of time at the East Anglian School of Painting and Drawing, the art school established and run by Cedric Morris. Her recollections of her time there were included in the book Benton End Remembered. In the 1930s she toured Europe with Lucy Harwood, painting street scenes in Bruges, Paris, Dieppe and Brittany. During World War II Broadley worked as a volunteer with the Women's Land Army. After the War she spent some time as a teacher before joining an Anglican religious order, the Community of the Servants of the Cross, based at Ham Common and, other than during a spell in Australia, appears to have done little painting. After leaving the order Broadley settled in Suffolk and resumed painting, often with bold colours and brush strokes, and also embraced collage making. She had paintings exhibited at the Royal Academy in London, with the New English Art Club and had a solo exhibition of paintings and collages at the Graham & Oldham Gallery in Ipswich during 1999.
