= Harry Barr =

English painter

Harry Barr (1896-1987) was a painter. He produced a large body of work, the majority in watercolour.

== Biography ==
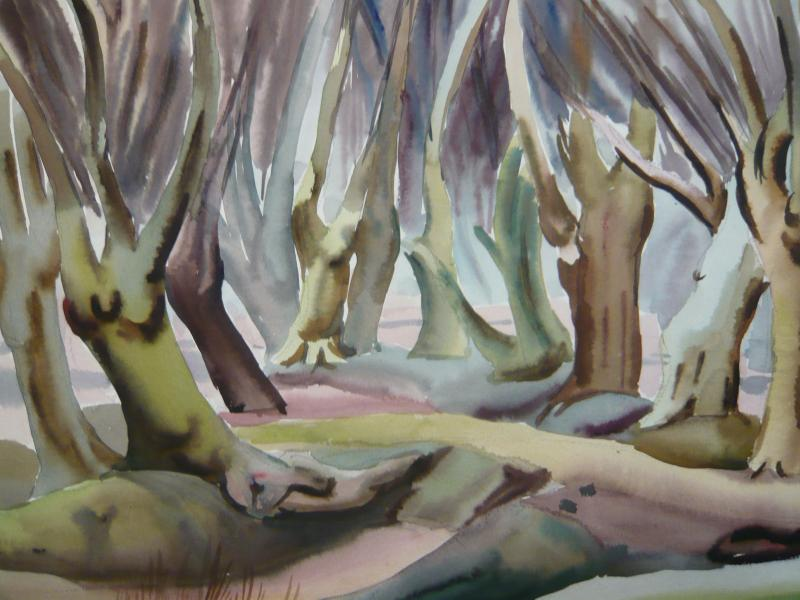
A watercolour painting of Epping Forest by Harry Barr, 1948

Barr was born in London. He studied at the Westminster School of Art where he was taught by the artist Walter Sickert and earned his diploma in 1915. Sickert remained an artistic mentor and a friend until he died in 1942. Barr was also good friends from childhood with David Bomberg (they both grew up in Whitechapel in the East End of London) until Bomberg's death in 1957.

Barr's first London exhibition was held in a Bloomsbury gallery in January 1920. Later in that year he moved to Paris, where he befriended the sculptor Ossip Zadkine, who helped him find a studio. He had his first exhibition of oil paintings in Paris at the Galerie Mouninou on the Rue Marbeuf.

Watercolour became Barr's main medium around 1939. He focused on painting nature. Among his most frequent subjects were trees that took on an anthropromorphic character. He painted all manner of landscapes and seascapes. His often pastoral scenes have been described as having "an economy of tone and statement that is positively Japanese".

Barr also produced many drawings in pencil. He had a fondness for animals, spending hours drawing at London Zoo. A particular favourite, pigs, were often the focus of a painting expedition – he was not shy of getting into the sty to paint them.

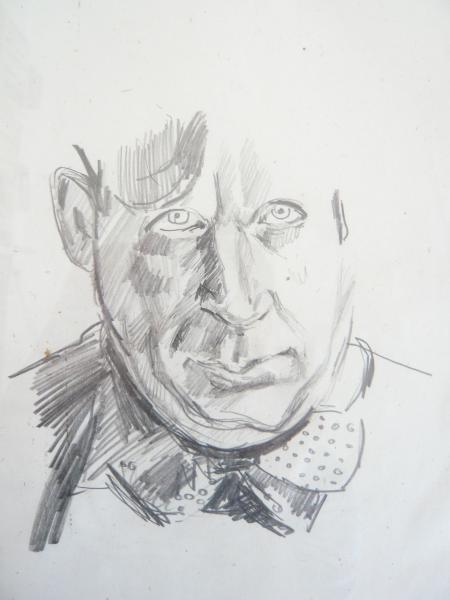
A pencil self-portrait of Harry Barr

Barr had various exhibitions in London, one at the Kaplan gallery in 1965. This exhibition caught the attention of art critic Max Wykes-Joyce, whose write-up in the Arts Review stated that Harry Barr's "work can be compared with the best of British watercolourists, past or present". In the same year an exhibition of 60 paintings was held at Friendship House in Moscow. This was recorded as the first one-man show of a British artist in the USSR. The exhibition was well received and was extended from an original two to six weeks, showing also in Leningrad and Minsk. Other exhibitions in London included those at the October Gallery and posthumously at the Catto Gallery in 1990.

Barr travelled and painted all over the British Isles both on commission and for pleasure. One particular commission came from the Crown to paint the reclamation of the Wash. He developed close ties with this area and continued to visit and paint there.

Though likened to Philip Wilson Steer, the British impressionist, Barr resisted pressure to join any of the English art movements. He regarded painting as a necessary job, something he was compelled to do. He would paint most days and in any weather, often using the effects of the weather (such as dappling from rain) in the pictures.

Barr's most distinctive works are characterised by the use of a knife to score the paper before painting. He described this technique in an interview published in the Daily Mail, explaining it as "an act of creation, and creation is not polite and hesitant". He continued painting until his death in 1987 at the age of 91.
