= Florence Engelbach =

English painter (1872–1951)

Florence Ada Engelbach
- Born: Florence Ada Neumegen; 9 June 1872; Jerez de la Frontera, Spain
- Died: 27 February 1951 (aged 78); London
- Education: Westminster School of Art; Slade School of Art
- Known for: Painting

Florence Ada Engelbach née Neumegen (9 June 1872 – 27 February 1951) was a painter of portraits, landscapes and flower pieces. She was born in Spain to English parents and, after training in London, established her artistic career in Britain.

== Biography ==
Engelbach was born in Spain, at Jerez de la Frontera, to English parents. During the 1890s she studied in London at the Westminster School of Art and at the Slade School of Art before completing her studies in Paris. Engelbach had works shown at the Laing Art Gallery in Newcastle and at the Paris Salon. In 1901 she had a picture shown, under her maiden name, at the Royal Academy in London. She was awarded a bronze medal at a Women's International Art Club exhibition held in London. In 1902 she married a C.F.R Engelbach and withdrew from a full-time art and exhibition career to raise a family. Engelbach returned to painting in the late 1920s and had a solo show at the Beaux Arts Gallery in 1931. She went on to resume exhibiting at both the Royal Academy and the Paris Salon and also with the Royal Institute of Oil Painters and the National Society of Painters, Sculptors and Gravers/ Printmakers and became a member of the latter two societies. The Goupil, Tooths and Lefevre galleries were among the commercial concerns that showed her work. Originally Engelbach was a portrait painter but later became a specialist flower painter who also painted landscapes. Her painting Roses, from the 1930s, is held in the Tate collection. A memorial exhibition for Engelbach was held at the Leicester Galleries in 1951.
