= Jean Gibson =

British artist (1927–1991)

- Born: 1927; Stoke on Trent, England
- Died: 1991 (aged 63–64)
- Education: Wimbledon School of Art; Royal College of Art
- Known for: Sculpture
- Notable work: Reliefs on canvas, e.g. "Breakout III"
- Style: Abstract art
- Spouse: Anthony Whishaw RA
- Elected: Associate of the Royal College of Art, The London Group
- Website: jeangibsonsculptor.com

Jean Gibson (1927 – 1991) was a British artist known for her abstract sculptures, often in resin, canvas, fibreglass or perspex. She taught at Wimbledon School of Art and at her studio.

== Biography ==
Gibson was born in 1927, in Stoke on Trent and studied at the Wimbledon School of Art in London and then at the Royal College of Art, RCA, between 1954 and 1957. At the RCA Gibson met her future husband, the artist Anthony Whishaw. Gibson won a travelling scholarship to Italy, took part in group exhibitions with the London Group and had her first solo exhibition at the Leicester Galleries in 1965 and a second one at the same venue in 1969. Further solo exhibitions included shows at the Oxford Gallery in 1974 and at the Nicola Jacobs Gallery in 1981. In 1977, Gibson began making reliefs on canvas after developing an allergy to the resin used in sculptures. From 1978 until her death in 1991, aged 63 or 64, works by Gibson regularly featured in the annual Royal Academy Summer Exhibition. Gibson was commissioned to create two relief panels for the liner Oriana. Other public commissions included for the Commonwealth Institute in London in 1976 and for the Tel Aviv Museum in 1976.

== Work ==
Gibson claimed the Polish-Russian artist and art theorist, Kazimir Malevich, as her spiritual father. She was also captivated by the psychoanalytic process, as possibly analogous to the expression in art of the material from the unconscious self. A description of this is hinted at by the art historian and Carmelite, Wendy Beckett.

What distinguishes Jean Gibson’s work, and deepens the paradox of the austere form and the explosive emotional content, is that her work is far more substantial and physically demanding than merely putting brush to canvas. She creates her sculptures from dense and hard materials, wrestling them into submission, pressing them out, waiting for them to set…

== Teaching ==
Gibson taught sculpture, at the studio she shared with Whishaw in Kensington, to people who pursued other occupations and came to art later in life. They included social workers, psychotherapists, medical doctors and the fashion designer, Nicole Farhi.

== Legacy ==
A joint exhibition of works by Whishaw and Gibson was held in 2018 at the Canwood Gallery and Sculpture Park.
