= Marjorie Sherlock =

British painter

- Born: 1897 (Note: The BBC Your Paintings series and many other sources state that she was born in 1897. the Oxford Dictionary of National Biography stated that she was born 3 February 1891.)
- Died: 1973
- Education: Westminster Technical Institute, Slade School of Fine Art, Royal College of Art
- Known for: Painting and etching
- Spouse: Wilfrid Kenyon Tufnell Barrett (divorced)

Marjorie Sherlock (1897-1973) was a British painter and etcher. Three books of her etchings were published between 1925 and 1932. Her painting Liverpool Street Station, now in the Government Art Collection, was first shown at the Royal Academy in 1917 and in 1987 was at 10 Downing Street when Margaret Thatcher was Prime Minister of the United Kingdom.

She studied at the Westminster Technical Institute, a pupil of Walter Sickert and Harold Gilman; at the Slade School of Fine Art; and the Royal College of Art. In Paris, she studied and worked with André Dunoyer de Segonzac and André Lhote. She was influenced by the Camden Town Group. Her works were exhibited at the Royal Academy for 50 years. She was a friend and travelling companion of Orovida Pissarro, the daughter of Lucien Pissarro.

== Personal life ==
Alice Marjorie Sherlock was born to Alice Mary (née Platts) Sherlock and civil engineer Henry Alexander George Sherlock at Fir Tree Cottage, George Lane, Wanstead, Essex. In 1918 she married her first cousin, Wilfrid Kenyon Tufnell Barrett, who was born in 1897. They later divorced. Barrett, an Army Major, died in 1975. She was described as "a woman of distinct and forceful character."

Sherlock liked to travel and visited the United States during the depression. In the 1940s she moved to Axminster, near Ottery St Mary in a "rambling" and "isolated" house. Orovida Pissarro, the daughter of Lucien Pissarro, lived near her and financed trips for the two of them. Sherlock grew her own vegetables and made her own clothes to supplement her limited income. She died of a heart attack on 2 April 1973 at her house on Angela Court in Tipton St John, Devon.

== Education ==
During World War I, Sherlock studied under Walter Sickert and Harold Gilman at the Westminster Technical Institute. In 1917 Liverpool Street Station, an oil painting, was exhibited at the Royal Academy. Gilman died in 1919, after only a short time as a teacher at Westminster, but by then he had inspired a loyal group of followers, including Mary Godwin, Ruth Doggett, and Sherlock, who carried on with his approach into the 1920s and 1930s.

Sherlock also studied at the Slade School of Fine Art and studied etching beginning in 1926 at the Royal College of Art. She worked in Paris with Dunoyer de Segonzac and André Lhote.

== Artist ==
Sherlock made oil paintings and copper etchings, in pen and ink, and in pencil. She created detailed, complex works, like the etching Waterloo Station. Her Egyptian, German and Indian etchings were published in 1925, 1929 and 1932, respectively. She was influenced by the Camden Town Group. (Note: Camden Town Group was a male-member organization, but there were female artists like Ethel Sands, Anna Hope Hudson and Sherlock that were involved on the periphery.)

For more than 50 years her works were exhibited at the Royal Academy of Arts. There were also exhibited in other group exhibitions at the Carnegie Institute, the International Society of Sculptors, Painters, and Gravers, the Royal Society of British Artists, Chicago Society of Etchers, the New English Art Club, and the Society of Graphic Art.

Her painting Liverpool Street, made in 1917, was in the 10 Downing Street collection in 1987, when Margaret Thatcher was Prime Minister of the United Kingdom.

== Works ==
A few of her works are:

- Liverpool Street Station, 1917, Government Art Collection
- Liverpool Street Station in the Twenties, 1920s, National Railway Museum
- Railway Lines in the Snow, 1921, Bristol Museum and Art Gallery
- Landscape with Railway, date unknown, Government Art Collection
- Waterloo Station, etching, date unknown.
