= Ruth Doggett =

English artist

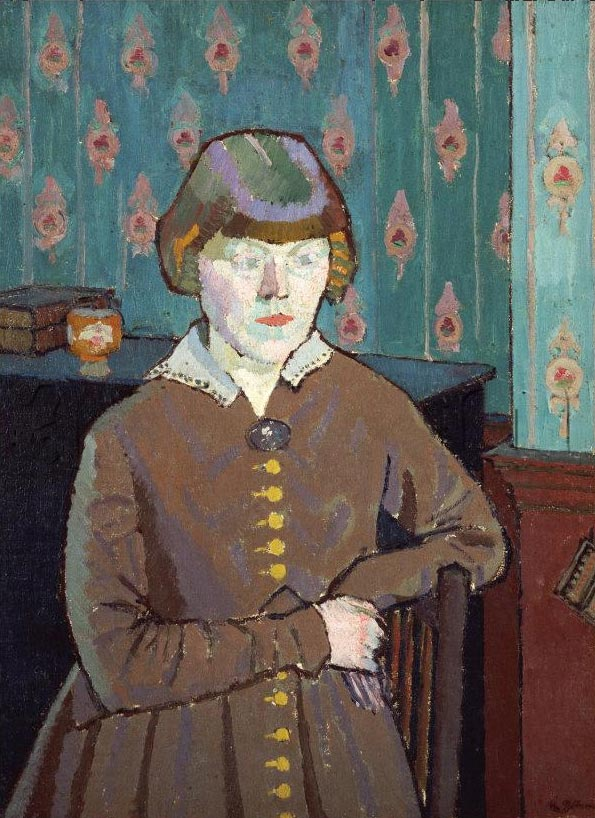
Doggett, painted by Harold Gilman

Ruth Thornhill Doggett (28 April 1881 – 23 March 1974) was an English artist and a member of the London Group, known for her control of colour and composition in landscapes, still lifes and interiors.

== Early life and education ==
Born in Camberwell, South London, Doggett was one of several children of George Henry Doggett, a managing clerk, and his wife Mary Ann Bradbury. By 1891, the family was living in Cambridge. Between 1894 and 1909, Doggett studied at the Cambridge School of Arts and Crafts.

While there, she won a bronze medal (the second highest award in that class) at the National Competition of Works of Art held by the Board of Education in South Kensington in 1905. In 1906–07, Doggett received a scholarship, and awards for still life painting and a copper name plate. In 1907–08, she won a bronze medal for a poster design and a prize for modelling from the antique. In 1908, she won a prize of £5 offered by the Cambridge Arts and Crafts Society for a poster design, as well as awards at the Society's annual exhibition for her designs for a Christmas card, a program cover, a chestnut roaster and a hearth brush. At the Cambridge School of Arts and Crafts' 1909 annual exhibition, Doggett won first prizes for a set of works produced during the year, and for design.

== Career ==
By 1911, Doggett had moved to Chelsea, London, to work as an art teacher and was living in a boarding house with several other single women.

She became a student at the Westminster School of Art, where she was taught by Walter Sickert, and won a medal in 1913. She showed some of her work in the Exhibition of the Work of English Post-Impressionists, Cubists and Others, at Brighton in 1913, an event which marked the division between Post-Impressionism and what became known as vorticism. Doggett went on to become a member of the newly formed London Group. Throughout 1914 and 1915 she was taught by Harold Gilman, and he drew and painted her around 1915.

After Gilman's death in 1919, a group of his followers, including Ruth Doggett, Mary Godwin, and Marjorie Sherlock, carried on working under his influence into the 1920s and 1930s. Doggett's work reflected the vivid colours and craftsmanship of Gilman. In two exhibitions in 1922, her work was noted by The Observer art critic P. G. Konody as "excellent", "delightful", "typical of the aims of the London Group; and closely akin to Stanisława de Karłowska's, though a little less deliberate or emphatic in the choice of form and colour". In the London Group's 23rd exhibition in 1926, Doggett's work Interior was among those noted by The Times "which would well support the close attention compelled by modern housing". The Sunday Times art critic Frank Rutter, in reviewing the Royal Society of British Artists 1931 exhibition, wrote "Miss Ruth Doggett's Wiltshire Downs deserve[s] notice among many pleasant landscapes", and in 1933, describing "the appalling dullness" of an exhibition at the Royal Institute of Oil Painters, Rutter singled out Doggett's Beech Trees as one of the exceptions, "show[ing] a nice sense of colour and intimate handling".

Doggett had a solo exhibition called August in England at the Fine Art Society in 1934, with Charles Ginner writing an introduction to the catalogue. Reviewers were positive. Jan Gordon, writing in The Observer, said, "Since about 1920 lovers of good painting have been watching her work, yet this is the first one-woman show she has ventured to give. Such modesty is quite in keeping with the restrained and unaggressive character of her pictures. Her outstanding quality is a perfect control of what may be termed "colour-tone". Everything in her art blends into a very personal and harmonious whole".

The Times reviewer of August in England wrote that Doggett "achieved an admirable and intelligent balance between pure impressionism, which follows all the vagaries of the light and the landscape, and a method of sound, at times systematic, construction. It is a difficult balance, and ... in a few pictures her colour suffers in the process and in a few others her method of simplification is rather harsh. But for the most part she is remarkably successful; she knows when to stop and ... manages her talents competently, economically and with assurance."

Rutter, in The Sunday Times, described the works in this exhibition as "mostly of English landscape in high summer, and they have great charm and distinction in their rhythmic but unaffected design, and particularly in their warm but refined colour. ... Miss Doggett gives us the sunny summer loveliness of the English countryside expressed in terms of exquisitely harmonious colour. ... her sensitive perception of colour values and nice sense of arrangement are seen as delightfully in her few interiors as in the landscapes."

The regional newspaper Western Morning News reported that there were "some excellent Westcountry paintings" in the exhibition, but thought that "though she is perhaps too wedded to the English tradition her colour is exciting, though not loud, she can design, and she can draw. ... these pictures, warm and loving as they are, would be better still if Miss Doggett did not so much immerse herself in her landscape or communicate with it as possess it and master it."

Paintings mentioned by reviewers of the 1934 solo exhibition included Chidcock, in which "the suffused unity ... is a remarkable achievement"; Quarr Hill, Chidcock; Gunwalloe, "a very sunny and still picture of great tact and charm", "its glittering lights contrasted with atmospheric shadows proves that this sense of colour-tone unity is a basic virtue of her vision"; Village Street, Gunwalloe; The Road to St. Germains, showing "her capacity for bold design"; "the floating clouds over Wiltshire Downs Above Ramsbury"; "the luminosity of the sunlit Village Street, Tregavarris"; Tregavarris – Evening; Downderry; Downderry – Evening; Trewall Farm, Downderry; and "the spacious Essex landscape in the View From Rookwood Hall".

Doggett's omission from the third edition of the Arts Trade Press's Who's Who in Art, in which "the editor has ... allowed the artists to dictate their own importances", was noted by Jan Gordon in The Observer as one of several "artists all well known in their different branches of the profession".

In his Modern Masterpieces (1935), Rutter pictures Doggett's painting The Window and reports on her solo show of 1934, mentioning that she also exhibited at the New English and the Royal Institute.

Doggett continued to exhibit in the years prior to the Second World War. Rutter, reviewing the London Group's 34th exhibition in 1936 in The Sunday Times, wrote "the member who appears to have made the most progress this year, whose work stands out prominently ... is Ruth Doggett. In an exhibition where so much seems perverse and downright silly, her landscapes and flower-pieces form welcome oases of sense and sensibility." He noted that "Green apples have ... very rarely indeed .. been an excuse for such lovely colour as Miss Doggett gives us in her Still Life. Exceedingly beautiful again is the colour in her Vase of Flowers, in which also the form of the individual blossoms is realised with fine definition and plastic power. Her landscapes, The Dead Elm and Cornfields combine naturalness of effect with well-thought out composition and ... have the charm of a colour scheme that is sweet without ever becoming cloying."

By 1939, Doggett had returned to live with her parents, three unmarried sisters, and a brother, in Cambridge, and was described in that year as a retired teacher. However, her parents both died in 1940, her father leaving an estate valued at £9,708, equivalent to £669,596 in 2023. She later moved with her sisters to live at London Road, St Leonards-on-Sea, East Sussex. She died on 23 March 1974.
