= David Whittaker (cricketer) =

English cricketer

David Whittaker (25 October 1857 – 17 December 1901) was an English cricketer active from 1884 to 1888 who played for Lancashire. He was born in Church, Lancashire and died in Rishton. He appeared in nine first-class matches as a lefthanded batsman who bowled left arm medium pace. He scored 128 runs with a highest score of 26 and held four catches. He took one wicket with a best analysis of one for 26. In 1901, Whittaker drowned himself in the Leeds and Liverpool Canal.
