= David Whitaker (artist) =

British artist (1938–2007)

David Whitaker (8 June 1938 – 15 March 2007) was a British abstract artist and art teacher.

== Early life and education ==
Whitaker was born in Blackpool, Lancashire. He studied at the Blackpool and the Fylde School of Art for 6 years from the age of 13 and moved to London in the late 1950s, where he began working as a graphic designer. He did not enjoy the work, and left to become a milkman instead. The early hours suited him: his job finished early, and he could spend the rest of the day painting. He married fellow artist Frances Wood in 1959, and studied as a mature student at the Royal Academy Schools from 1962 to 1966.

== Later career and recognition ==
Whitaker was one of the first artists to have a sholo show at the Serpentine Gallery when it opened in London in 1970. He won the Mark Rothko Memorial Award in 1973 at the recommendation of Bridget Riley, which allowed him to work in the U.S. for several months. He then taught at the Ruskin School of Art in Oxford, helping to oversee the school's merger with the University of Oxford, before becoming a lecturer at the Wimbledon College of Art in 1984, retiring in 2001. He was elected as a member of the London Group in 1989, of the Colour Group (Great Britain) in 1996, and became a Fellow of the Royal Watercolour Society in 2004. He won a Hunting Art Prize in 1996, and won the Singer Friedlander National Watercolour Competition in 2001. Beginning in the 1960s, Whitaker held many one-man exhibitions over more than 40 years as a practitioner. Two retrospectives of his work were shown at the Rebecca Hossack Gallery, the second in the summer of 2013.

== Works ==
Whitaker's works in oils and watercolour are characterised by their use of straight lines of seven colours: two shades of yellow, cadmium red, magenta, viridian, and two shades of blue. His paintings were created in layers, using tape to create straight-sided stencils. The final effect, only revealed when the tape was removed, produced a shimmering graduation of colour from stripe to stripe over the canvass.

== Personal life ==
Outside art, Whitaker was a keen marathon runner with Kingston Stragglers, and played cricket in the Lancashire League. He died in 2007 in Kingston upon Thames and was survived by his wife, Frances, and their three sons.
