= Westminster School of Art =

Former art school in Westminster, London

Coordinates: 51.4973°N 0.1287°W

- Type: Art school
- Location: Westminster, London, England, United Kingdom
- Language: English

The Westminster School of Art was an art school in Westminster, London.

== History ==
The Westminster School of Art was located at 18 Tufton Street, Deans Yard, Westminster, and was part of the old Royal Architectural Museum. H. M. Bateman described it in 1903 as:

"... arranged on four floors with galleries running round a big square courtyard, the whole being covered over with a big glass roof. Off the galleries were the various rooms which made up the school, the galleries themselves being filled with specimens of architecture which gave the whole place the air of a museum, which of course it was."

In 1904 the art school moved and merged with the Westminster Technical Institute, in a two-story building on Westminster's Vincent Square, established by the philanthropy of Angela Burdett-Coutts, 1st Baroness Burdett-Coutts in 1893.

== People associated with the School ==
=== Academics and teachers ===
- Adrian Allinson, art teacher (c. 1947)
- Walter Bayes
- Professor Frederick Brown, headmaster (1877–1892)
- Mark Gertler
- Harold Gilman
- Nina Hamnett, art teacher (1917–1918)
- Richard Arthur Ledward
- Bernard Meninsky
- Mervyn Peake
- Eric Schilsky
- Walter Sickert
- Hilary Stratton, Sculpture (1931–39)
- Christopher J. Yorath, lecturing engineer (1908–09)

=== Alumni ===
- Jean Appleton
- Clare Atwood
- Mary Audsley
- J M Balliol Salmon
- Harry Barr
- H. M. Bateman
- Aubrey Beardsley
- Jean Bellette
- Robert Polhill Bevan
- David Bomberg
- Wendela Boreel
- Denise Broadley
- Theo Brown
- Irene Mary Browne
- Stella Bowen
- Alfred Brumwell Thomas
- Henry Charles Brewer
- Emily Carr
- Frances Crawshaw
- John Craxton
- Ruth Doggett
- Florence Engelbach
- Nora England
- Jeffery Farnol, author
- Daphne Fedarb
- Elizabeth Bertha Fraser
- Diana Gardner
- James Gardner, designer (c. 1923)
- Margaret Geddes
- Eric Gill, stonemasonry student (c. 1901)
- Sylvia Gosse
- Duncan Grant
- Barbara Greg
- Richard Hamilton
- Weaver Hawkins
- Paul Haefliger
- Evie Hone
- Mainie Jellett
- David Jones
- Lilian Lancaster
- John Luke
- Dugald Sutherland MacColl
- Rose Mead
- John Mennie
- Elizabeth Polunin
- Norman Mills Price
- Alfred William Rich
- Michael Sherard, fashion designer
- Marjorie Sherlock
- Sam Smith, toy-maker
- Barbara Austin Taylor
- Robert Tollast
- Christopher Tunnard, landscape architect (1932)
- Dame Ethel Walker
- John Millar Watt
- Clifford Webb
- Victor Winding
