= Harold Gilman =

English painter

Harold John Wilde Gilman
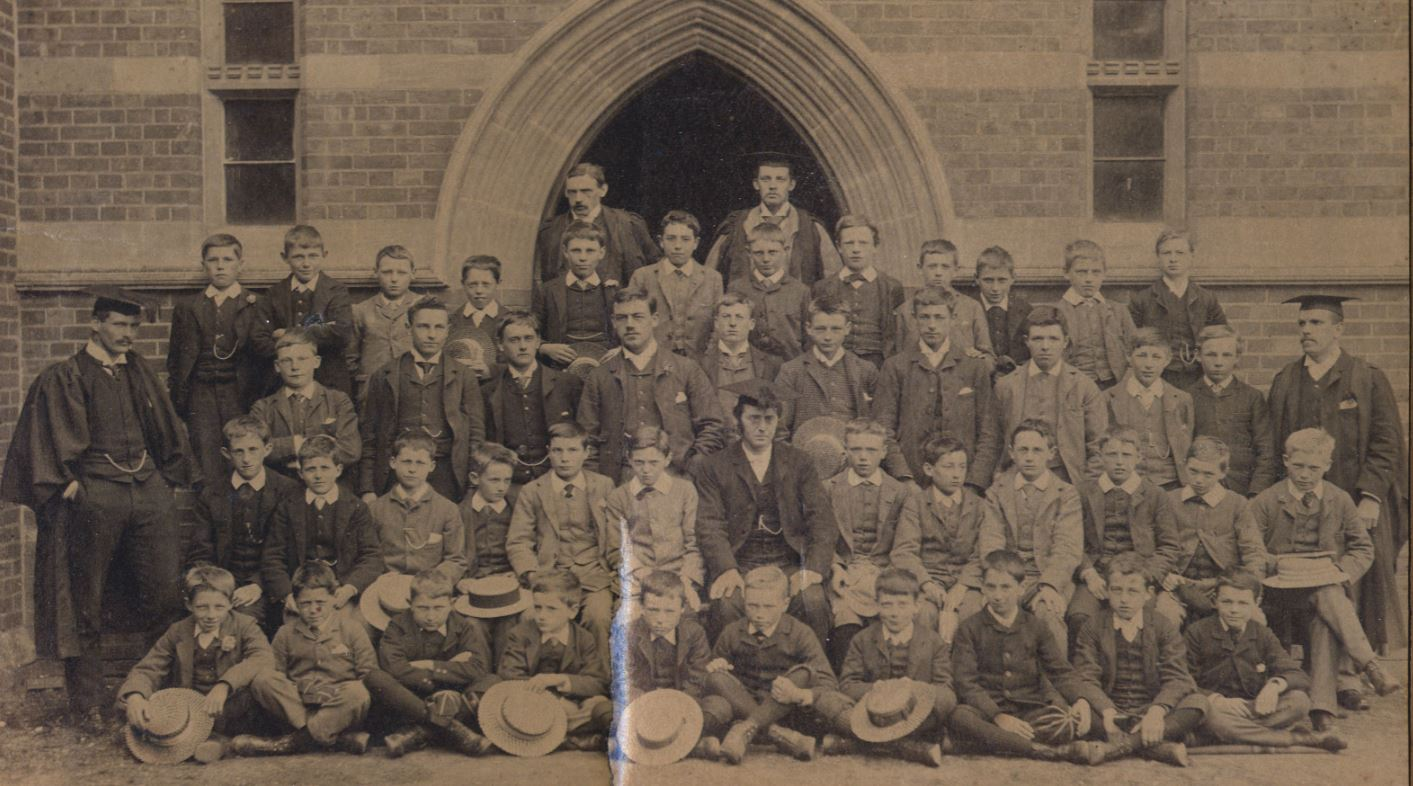
- Harold John Wilde Gilman pictured in the 1888 Abingdon School photograph. Gilman is on the bottom row, 4th from right.
- Born: 11 February 1876; Rode, Somerset, England
- Died: 12 February 1919 (aged 43); London, England
- Occupation: Painter

Harold John Wilde Gilman (11 February 1876 – 12 February 1919) was a British painter of interiors, portraits and landscapes, and a founder-member of the Camden Town Group.

== Early life and studies ==
Harold John Wilde Gilman was the second son and one of the seven children of Emily Purcell Gulliver and John Gilman, curate of Rode, Somerset. Though born in Rode, Gilman spent his early years at Snargate Rectory, in the Romney Marshes in Kent, where his father was the Rector. He was educated in Kent, Abingdon School in Berkshire, from 1885 to 1890, in Rochester and at Tonbridge School, and for one year at Brasenose College in Oxford University.

Although he developed an interest in art during a childhood convalescence period, Gilman did not begin his artistic training until after his year at Oxford University (cut short by ill health) and after working in Ukraine as a tutor to a British family in Odessa (1895). In 1896 he entered the Hastings School of Art to study painting, but in 1897 transferred to the Slade School of Fine Art in London, where he remained from 1897 to 1901, and where he met Spencer Gore. In 1902 he went to Spain and spent over a year studying Spanish masters. Velázquez and Goya as well as Whistler were major early influences.

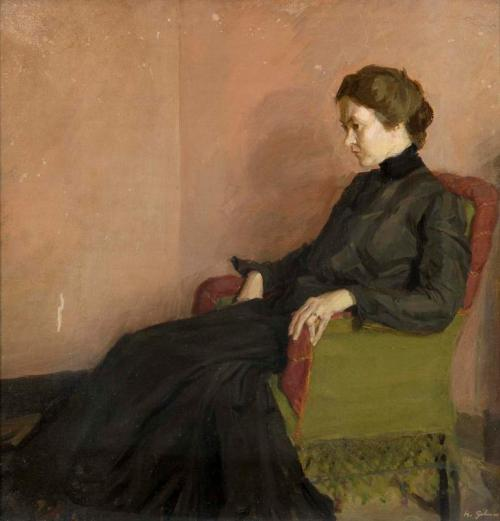
Gilman's portrait of his first wife, Grace Canedy

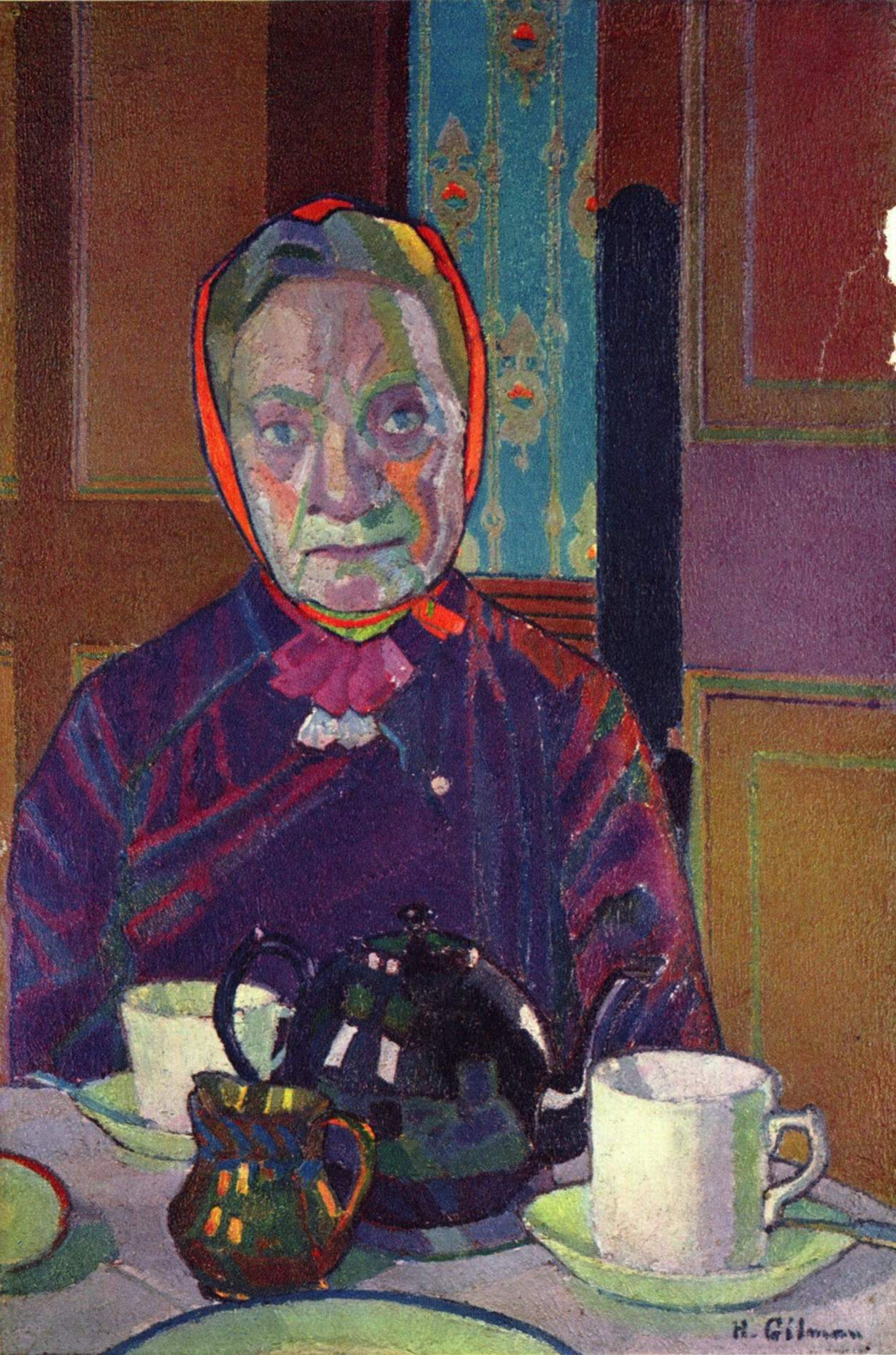
Mrs Mounter at the Breakfast Table, 1917

Detail of Mrs Mounter at the Breakfast Table, 1917 – showing closeness of actual tones

== Marriages ==
At this time Gilman met the American painter Grace Cornelia Canedy; they had both been copying Velázquez in the Museo del Prado in Madrid. They married on 7 February 1903 in the garden of the United States consulate in Toledo, Spain. The couple settled in London (apart from a visit to her family in Chicago, when Gilman ducked pressure to join the Canedy family business). They had five children, of whom three survived, Elizabeth (born 19 January 1904, in London), Hannah (born 4 February 1905, in Chicago), and David Canedy (born 20 September 1908, at Letchworth Garden City in Hertfordshire). The family address at this time was 15 Westholm Green, Letchworth. Grace Gilman left him in 1909, taking her three children to Chicago. The couple were later divorced.

Harold Gilman was married, for the second time, to (Dorothy) Sylvia Hardy (formerly Meyer), an artist he had met at Westminster and who had studied with him since 1914. She had their child in December 1917 and they married on 20 April 1918, on learning that Gilman's divorce had been finalised. After Gilman's death, in 1921 Sylvia married Leofric Gilman, his brother.

== Painting career ==
Meeting Walter Sickert in 1907, Gilman became a founder member of both the Fitzroy Street Group (in 1907) and the Camden Town Group (in 1911). In the meantime he joined the Allied Artists' Association, moved to Letchworth, and began to show influence from work of Vuillard as well as Sickert.

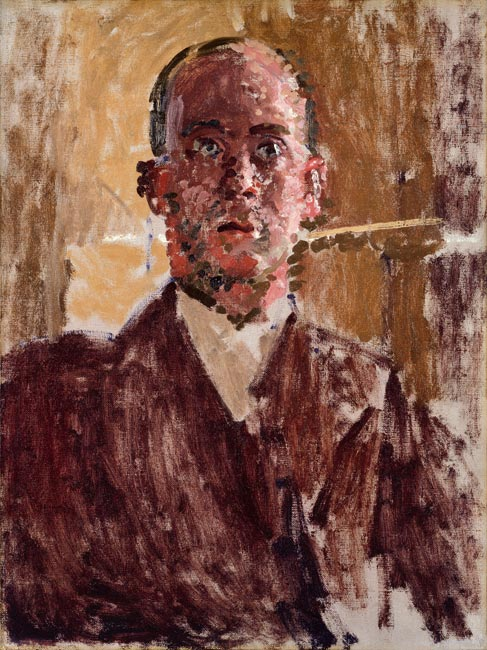
Harold Gilman painted by Walter Sickert, 1912.

In 1910 he was stimulated by the first post-Impressionist exhibition at the Grafton Galleries, and visited Paris with Ginner. He soon outpaced Sickert's understanding of post-Impressionism and moved out from under his shadow, using ever stronger colour, under the influence of Van Gogh, Gauguin and Signac. In 1913 he exhibited jointly with Gore, and became the first president of the London Group, and identified with Charles Ginner as a 'Neo-Realist', exhibiting with Ginner under that label in 1914.

Gilman visited Scandinavia in 1912 and 1913, and may have travelled with the artist William Ratcliffe, whose relations lived there. Gilman made studies of the environment, and painted Canal Bridge, Flekkefjord, an accurate depiction, whose subject is likely to have been inspired by Van Gogh's depiction of a similar bridge in Provence. Gilman had rejected Van Gogh's work when he first encountered it, but later became a strong admirer. According to Wyndham Lewis, he kept postcards of Van Gogh's work on his wall and sometimes hung one of his own works next to them, if he was especially satisfied with it.

In 1914 he joined Robert Bevan's short-lived Cumberland Market Group, with Charles Ginner and (later) John Nash. In 1915 the group held their only exhibition. From 1914 to 1917, he had lodgings at 47 Maple Street, where he painted many works, including his landlady, Mrs Mounter at the Breakfast Table.

He taught at the Westminster School of Art, where he influenced students such as Mary Godwin, Ruth Doggett, and Marjorie Sherlock. He then started his own school with Ginner.

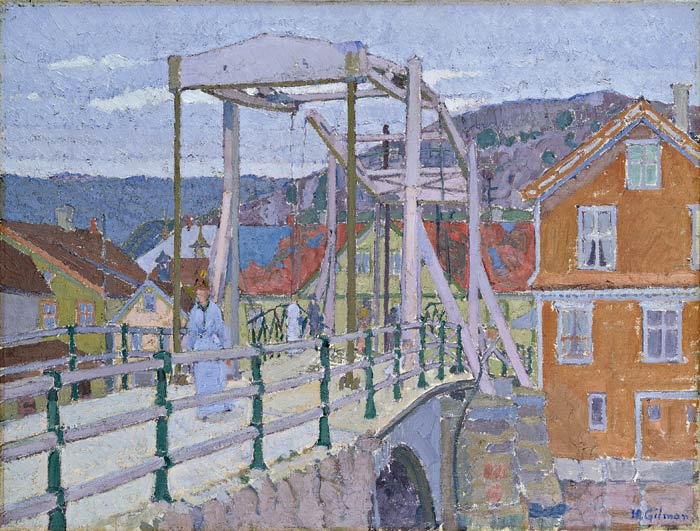
Canal Bridge, Flekkefjord, c. 1913

In 1918 he was commissioned to travel to Nova Scotia by the Canadian War Records; and painted a picture of Halifax Harbour for the War Memorial at Ottawa.

He died in London on 12 February 1919, of the Spanish flu.

== Legacy ==
Exhibitions were devoted to him at the Tate in 1954 and 1981, and he also featured in its 2007–2008 Camden Town Group retrospective at Tate Britain. David Bowie purchased Gilman's A London Interior for his private art collection; the piece was sold at auction after Bowie died in 2016.

== See also ==
- List of Old Abingdonians

== Gallery ==
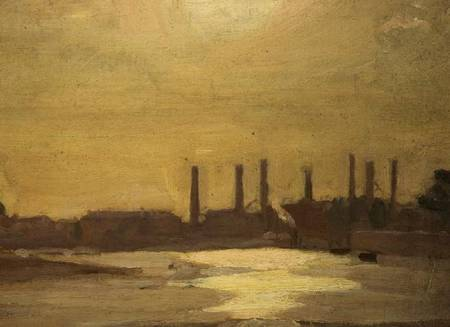
The Thames at Chelsea, 1899–1901

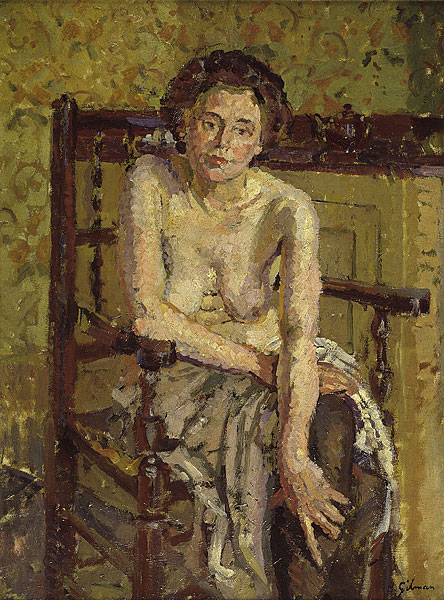
Clarissa, c. 1911

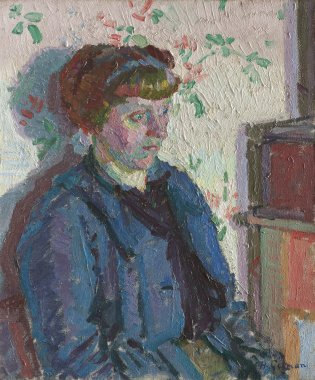
Sylvia Gosse, c. 1913

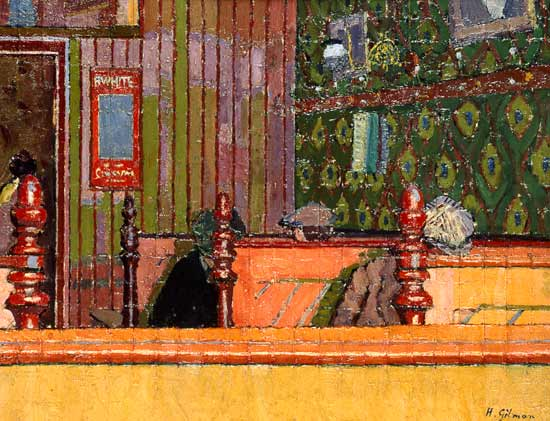
An Eating House, 1913/14

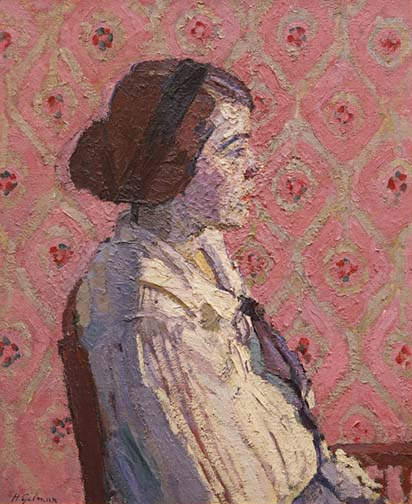
A Portrait in Profile: Mary L. Harold Gilman, 1914

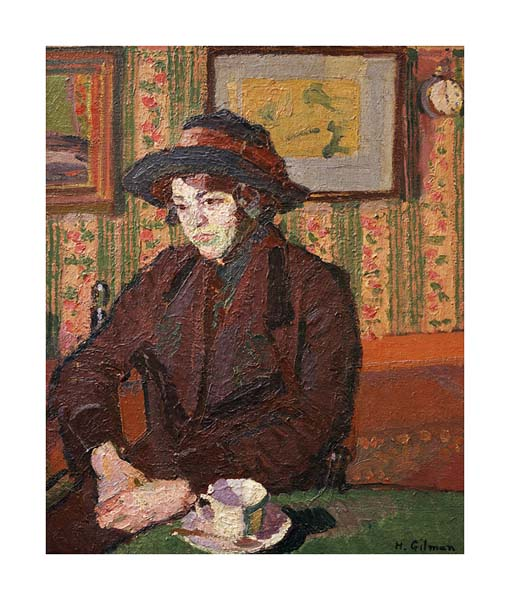
Girl with a Tea Cup, c. 1914

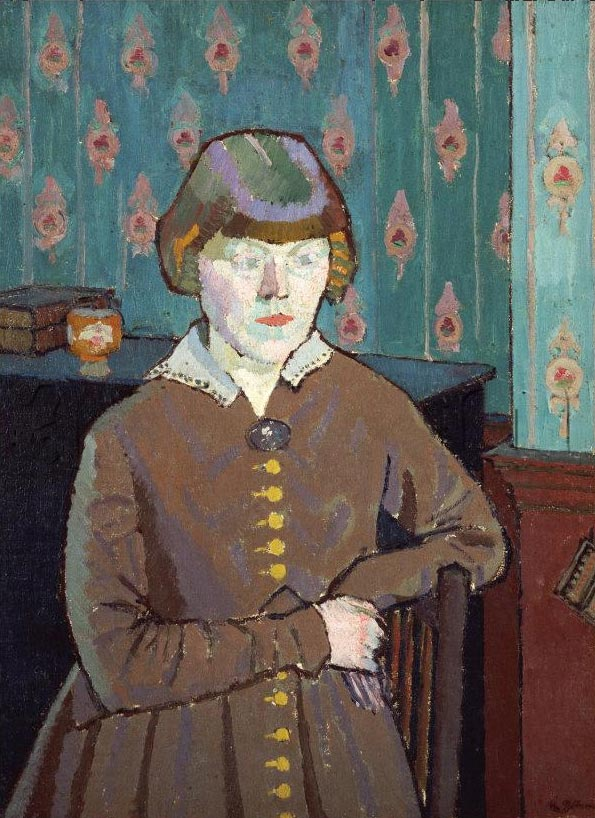
Miss Ruth Doggett, c. 1915

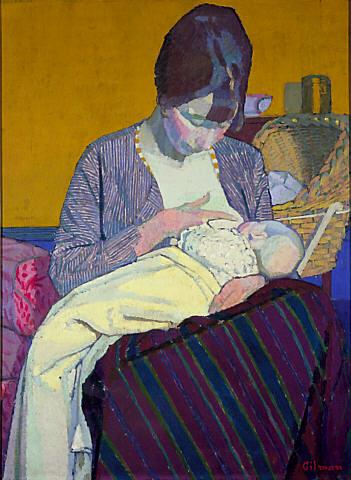
Mother and Child, 1918

== Bibliography ==
- Helena Bonett, 'Harold Gilman 1876–1919', artist biography, October 2009, in Helena Bonett, Ysanne Holt, Jennifer Mundy (eds.), The Camden Town Group in Context, Tate, May 2012, https://www.tate.org.uk/art/research-publications/camden-town-group/harold-gilman-r1105360
- Robert Upstone, Modern Painters: The Camden Town Group, exhibition catalogue, Tate Britain, London, 2008 ISBN 1-85437-781-7
- Harold Gilman and William Ratcliffe, Southampton City Art Gallery, 2002
