= Philippa Beale =

British visual artist, sculptor and curator

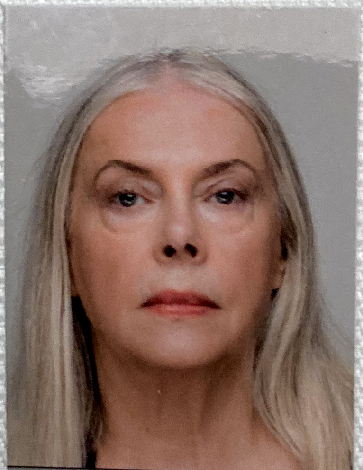
- Born: 1946 (age 79–80); Winchester, England
- Known for: Painting, sculpture, curator
- Movement: Conceptual Art, Arborealist
- Website: philippabeale.com

Philippa Beale (born 1946) is a British visual artist, sculptor, curator, educator, and writer whose work spans conceptual art, installation, painting, photography, and environmental art.

Emerging as part of the British conceptual art movement during the early 1970s, Beale is best known for installations exploring memory, landscape, identity, language, ecology, and the relationship between humans and the natural world. Since the 2010s, her work has focused primarily on trees and woodland ecosystems, leading to her becoming a founding member of the Arborealists, a collective of artists dedicated to contemporary representations of trees and forests in art.

Over a career spanning more than five decades, Beale has exhibited at institutions including the Camden Arts Centre, the Institute of Contemporary Arts, the Royal Academy of Arts, the Arnolfini, the Fruitmarket Gallery, Scotland and galleries throughout Europe, including Akumulatory 2 Galleria, Poznan, Poland and Musee de St Croix, Loudun, France.

She has been married to the artists David Troostwyk (1929-2009) and the writer and filmamker Christopher Plato. In July 2026, Beale was presented with a Special Recognition Cultural Award by Gibraltar's Minister for Culture, Christian Santos.

== Early life and education ==
Beale was born in Winchester, Hampshire, England, in 1946. She studied at Winchester School of Art before attending Goldsmiths, University of London between 1965 and 1969. She subsequently continued postgraduate study at the University of Reading before returning to Goldsmiths during the 1980s. Between 2000 and 2004 she undertook further postgraduate study at the University of the Arts London.

== Artistic career ==
=== Early conceptual practice ===
Beale held her first solo exhibition at Camden Arts Centre in 1972 with The Highgate Series: The Nostalgia Industry.

Throughout the 1970s she produced installations examining domestic life, childhood memory, consumer culture, and landscape. Rather than creating autonomous sculptural objects, she frequently assembled photographs, found materials, documentary evidence, natural objects, and written text into site-specific installations that encouraged viewers to reconsider relationships between memory and place.

Among her earliest environmentally focused works was Collected from Here (1978), based on material gathered from her mother's orchard. The project culminated in installations at the Angela Flowers Gallery in London and later at the Richard Demarco Gallery in Edinburgh, where hundreds of apples were incorporated into the exhibition, anticipating later environmental and ecological concerns within contemporary art.

=== Conceptual installations ===
During the 1980s and 1990s Beale continued producing multidisciplinary installations examining identity, language, media representation, childhood, religion, and political history.

Works including Baby Love, Blue Bird, His Ears are Small and Neat, His Chest is Covered with Soft Brown Hair, and From Wilson to Callaghan combined photography, sculpture, text, archival material, and installation to investigate changing representations of gender, politics, and visual culture in post-war Britain.

Her practice became increasingly interdisciplinary, integrating video, photography, sound, painting, and archival research into large-scale conceptual environments.

=== Environmental practice and the Arborealists ===
Following her relocation to rural western France in 2009, Beale increasingly focused on trees as both ecological subjects and cultural symbols.

She also created a permanent installation in Vaux en Couhe near Poitiers, France of the Stations of the Cross, Le Chemin de Croix . Her paintings and installations examine forests as living ecosystems while also exploring their historical, philosophical, and spiritual significance. This work culminated in her becoming one of the founding members of the Arborealists in 2014, a collective of artists dedicated to contemporary tree imagery and environmental awareness.

Curatorial work

Alongside her own artistic production, Beale has curated exhibitions examining conceptual art, environmental practice, and public engagement.

Her curatorial projects include Real Bodies Virtual City (2000), Les Arborealists, l’art des arbres (2017) Being With Trees (2021), An Absence (2023), Regeneration (2023–2024), Ancient Trees (2024), Forests, Woods and Groves (2024), and Traces of Humanity, Gustavo Bacarisas Gallery, Gibraltar (2026).

== Academic career ==
She began teaching art in Hampshire before joining Hornsey College of Art as a visiting tutor. She subsequently held progressively senior appointments at the London College of Printing, including Senior Lecturer, Head of Foundation Studies, Lecturer in Fine Art, Course Leader for Advanced Typographic Design, and Course Leader for the CNAA Postgraduate Diploma in Design and Media Technology, where she authored the proposal for a Master's programme in Advanced Typography.

In 1985 Beale joined Central Saint Martins College of Art and Design, becoming Course Leader responsible for integrating the former Central School of Art and Saint Martins School of Art foundation programmes into a unified curriculum. She later served as Head of Fine Art, Principal Lecturer, Director of Studies, and Dean, overseeing academic programmes, curriculum development, validation procedures, and quality assurance across the institution. As Director of Studies, her leadership received the highest rating during an Ofsted inspection.

Beale also represented the University of the Arts London on the Council for Higher Education in Art and Design (CHEAD), contributing to the development of national policy for art and design education in the United Kingdom.

Following her retirement, she supervised doctoral research at the University of East London's SMARTlab Research Institute and continued to serve as an external examiner, visiting tutor, and academic advisor for universities throughout Britain and internationally.

== Research and scholarly works ==
Beale has combined artistic practice with historical and theoretical research throughout her career. Her published work includes studies of conceptual art, environmental aesthetics, architectural history, and representations of trees in art. Among her best-known writings are The Chronology: From Wilson to Callaghan (1999), written with Simon Ford, A History of Architecture and the Tree (2016), and essays for the Arborealists' publications, including Forests, Woods and Groves (2024).

She has also written and produced several documentary films exploring conceptual art and British art education, including Wilson to Callaghan, Art School, and 11 Minutes on the Square, combining archival research with oral history and contemporary documentation.

Her publications include contributions to The Arborealists: The Art of the Tree (2016), Forests, Woods and Groves (2024), Traces of Humanity (2026) reflecting her ongoing engagement with ecological art and environmental philosophy.

Recent work (2023–2025)

In 2023 Beale presented the solo exhibition An Absence in Margate. Between 2023 and 2024 she co-curated Regeneration in London, examining ecological renewal through contemporary artistic practice.

From October 2024 until August 2025 her work featured in The Quietness of Feeling at Portsmouth Museum and Art Gallery, an exhibition exploring artistic responses to woodland landscapes and environmental change. In 2026, Beale curated Traces of Humanity, a project inspired by the Gorham's Cave Complex, a UNESCO World Heritage Site in Gibraltar. The project brought together approximately 35 artists and more than 65 artworks, with exhibitions in Margate and London before the final presentation at the Gustavo Bacarisas Gallery in Gibraltar from 1 to 31 July 2026. The programme also included talks, presentations and educational events concerning art, archaeology, history and human evolution.

== Works ==
=== Selected group exhibitions ===
- 2024 In the Footsteps of the East London Group, The Nunnery Gallery, London.
- 2023–24 Regeneration, Hansard Mews, London (co-curator with Day Bowman).
- 2022 Society of Graphic Fine Art Members’ Show, Bermondsey Project Space, London (curated/contributor)
- 2021 Being With Trees, Curator, Gustavo Bacarisis Gallery, Gibraltar.
- 2021 Being With Trees, Curator, Bermondsey Project Space, London.
- 2020 The Arborealists, The Castle Museum, Taunton, South West Heritage Centre.
- 2019 The Art Of Trees: The Arborealists, Musee de St Croix, Loudun, France.
- 2017 The Art of the Tree, Dortoir des Moines, Musee de St Benoit, Poitiers, France.
- 2017 The Art of the Tree, Bermondsey Project Space, UK.
- 2013 ‘Under the Greenwood, Picturing the British Tree’, St Barbe Art Gallery and Museum, Southampton Museum Service, Lymington.
- 2007 Blue Bird and Other Stories, 30 years of Conceptual Art Practice by Philippa Beale, collaborating with Jane Humphrey, Graham Diprose, Christopher Plato London College of Communication Galleries, London Stanley Kubrick Archive at the LCC Galleries.
- 2002 Art and the Spirit, The Stations of the Cross, Site Specific Installation, St Pancras Church, London.
- 2000 Real Bodies Virtual City, Curator with James Swinson, Outside Edge Artists Collective, London.
- 1995 The London Group, Curator The Curve, Barbican Arts Centre, President of the London Group.
- 1985 Critics Choice 2, by Guy Brett, Unquiet Studios, AIR Gallery. London.
- 1984 Artists for Bandaid at the Royal Academy of Arts, London.
- 1972 The Highgate Series, The Nostalgia Industry, Camden Arts Centre, London.
- 1971 Art Spectrum London, Alexandra Palace, London, UK.

=== Solo exhibitions ===
- 2023 An Absence, The Margate Gallery School, Margate.
- 2020 Imagining Trees Bermondsey Project Space, London.
- 2018 Trees, Chelsea Arts Club, London.
- 2007 Retrospective 30 years of Conceptual Art Practice, LCC Galleries, London.
- 2003 St Sebastian, Chelsea Arts Club, London.
- 2001 Visions, Key London Ltd., Wimpole Street, London.
- 1998 From Wilson to Callaghan, video viewing ICA, London.
- 1997 From Wilson to Callaghan, Posterstudio, London.
- 1992 Return to the Future, Exhibition with Neville Boden at the London Institute.
- 1990 Billboards, Dortioir sde Moines, Musse de Saint Benoit near Poitiers, France.
- 1985 Critics Choice 2, by Guy Brett Unquiet Studios, AIR Gallery. London.
- 1984 Blue Bird, Southampton City Art Gallery – about the exploration of children in the media.
- 1982 Baby Love Angela Flowers Gallery, London.
- 1981 His Ears are Small and Neat, His Chest is Covered with Soft Brown Hair, two multi-lingual artworks examining advertising. Akumulatory 2 Galleria, Poznan, Poland.
- 1978 Newtons Wonder, an installation of 100’s 1bs of apples raising environmental questions – Richard Demarco Gallery, Edinburgh.
- 1977 Collected from There, evidence collected from an Orchard, Angela Flowers Gallery, London.
  Collected from Here, evidence of reclamation, of the Acme Gallery site, Acme Gallery, London.
- 1973 Highgate Series, the Nostalgia Industry, Park Square Gallery, Leeds.
- 1972 Highgate Series, The Nostalgia Industry, Camden Arts Centre, London.

=== Selected publications ===
- Beale, Philippa. Forests, Woods and Groves: Art from the Arborealists. Batsford, 2024.ISBN 9781849949781
- Beale, Philippa (editor/essayist) Being With Trees ISBN 978-0-9555510-3-1 Plato-Beale Productions, 2019
- Beale, Philippa (essayist). The Arborealists: The Art of the Tree. Sansom & Co / Plato-Beale Productions, 2016. ISBN 978-0-9555510-5-5
- Beale, Philippa (editor/essayist ) Drawn to London Plato-Beale Productions, 2018 ISBN 978-0-9555510-7-9.
- Beale, Philippa Traces of Humanity (editor) ISBN 9778-1-91976-31-9 Gibraltar Cultural Services 2026
