= Eric Schilsky =

Eric Schilsky, RA (born Eric Clare Telford Schilsky; October 1898 in Southampton, Hampshire, England; died 29 March 1974, Edinburgh) was a sculptor.

Schooled in Geneva, and at the École des Beaux-Arts in Paris, he studied sculpture under Havard Thomas, at The Slade (1914–19) (interrupted by WW I service).

He was married to the painter Victorine Foot.

== Résumé ==
- Sculptor and lecturer, Westminster School of Art (1930s-1950s) and subsequently the Edinburgh College of Art (1950s-1970s)
- Elected ARA: 25 April 1957
- Elected RA: 26 April 1968
- Elected Senior RA: 31 December 1973
