= The London Group =

British artist society

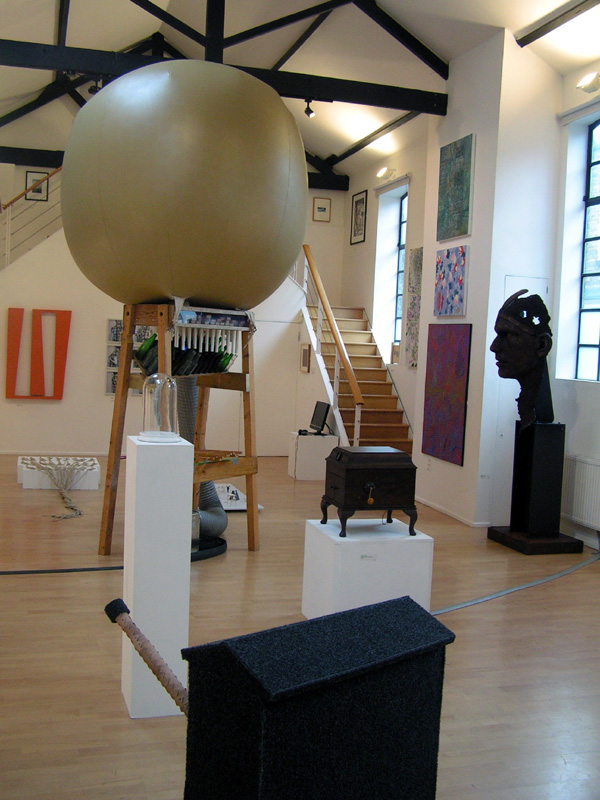
The London Group Open exhibition 2011 at the Cello Factory, London.

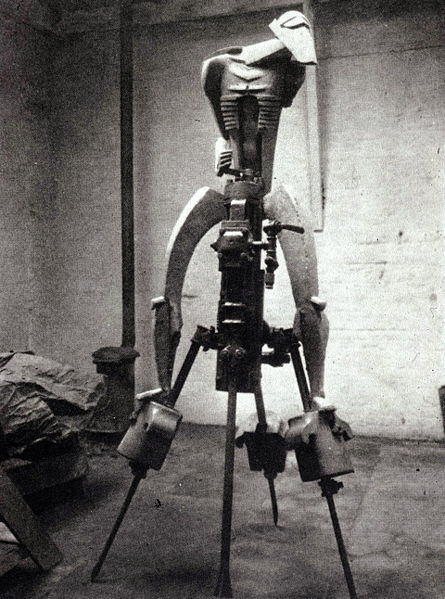
Jacob Epstein's 1913 sculpture The Rock Drill was first shown in the second London Group show in March 1915. The original is now lost.

The London Group is a society based in London, England, created to offer additional exhibiting opportunities to artists besides the Royal Academy of Arts. Formed in 1913, it is one of the oldest artist-led organisations in the world. It was formed from the merger of the Camden Town Group, an all-male group, and the Fitzroy Street Group. It holds open submission exhibitions for members and guest artists.

== Overview ==
The London Group is composed of working artists. All forms of art are represented. The group functions democratically without dogma or style. It has a written constitution, annually elected officers, working committees and a selection committee. There are usually between 80 and 100 members and an annual fee is charged to cover gallery hire and organisational costs. The group has no permanent exhibition venue and rents gallery space in London, most recently at the Menier Gallery, Bankside Gallery and Cello Factory. New members are elected most years, from nominations made by current members.

== History ==
The London Group was founded in 1913, when the Camden Town Group came together with the English Vorticists and other independent artists to challenge the domination of the Royal Academy of Arts, which had, they thought, become unadventurous and conservative.

The London Group emerged from a merger of the Fitzroy Street Group and the male-member-only Camden Town Group organization. Founding members included the artist and hostess Ethel Sands, artist Anna Hope Hudson, Walter Sickert, Jacob Epstein, Wyndham Lewis, Robert Bevan and his wife Stanislawa de Karlowska, and Henri Gaudier-Brzeska. Other early female members included Marjorie Sherlock, Mary Godwin, and Ruth Doggett. Throughout its history, The London Group has held open submission exhibitions to encourage and support other artists struggling to get their work shown in public. The open submissions are shown along with the work of existing members and guest artists. In 2011, the open exhibition presented over 140 artists at the Cello Factory.

In 2013–14, the Ben Uri Gallery celebrated The London Group's 100th anniversary with an exhibition, Uproar: The First 50 Years of The London Group 1913-1963, curated by Rachel Dickson and Sarah MacDougall. The exhibition highlighted the role played by women and emigre artists in its membership.

One of the oldest standing artist-led organisations in the world, The London Group continues to exist today with over 80 members.

== See also ==
- List of artists associated with The London Group
- List of presidents of The London Group
