= Omega Workshops =

Design enterprise founded by members of the Bloomsbury Group

Coordinates: 51.5224°N 0.1400°W

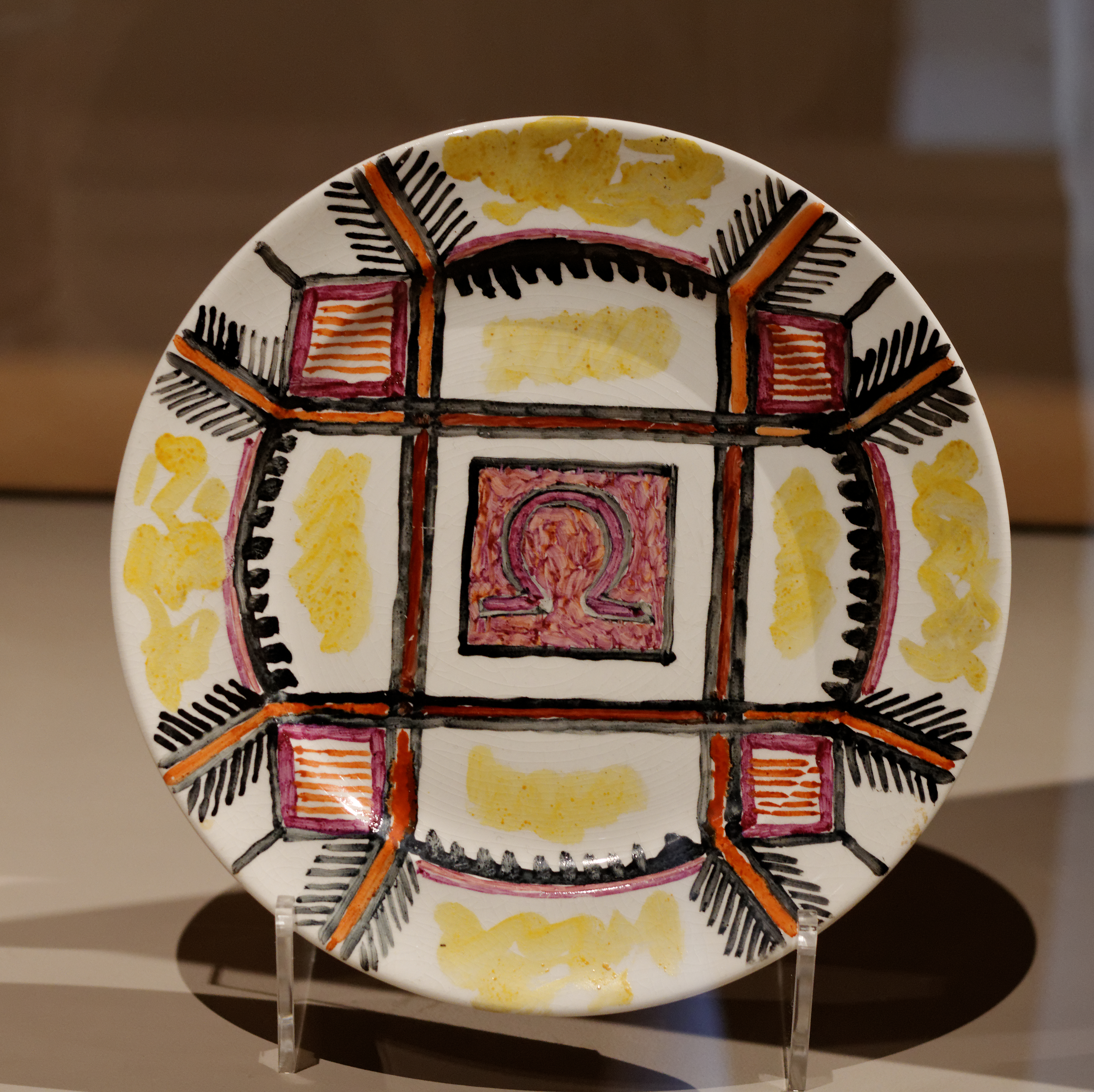
Plate with an Omega design

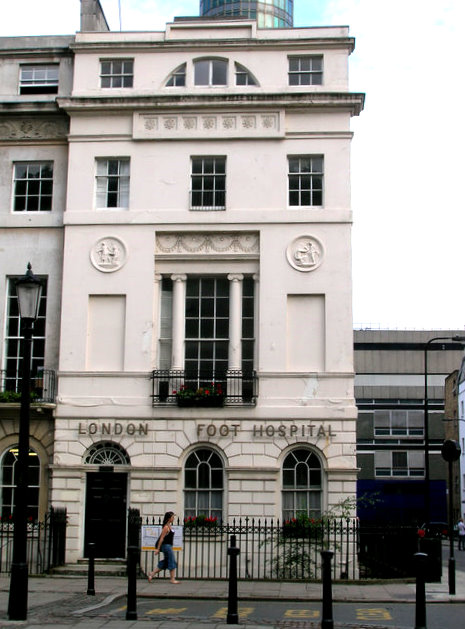
33 Fitzroy Square, London (from 1929 to 2003 the London Foot Hospital)

The Omega Workshops Ltd. was a design enterprise founded by members of the Bloomsbury Group and established in July 1913. It was located at 33 Fitzroy Square in London, and was founded with the intention of providing graphic expression to the essence of the Bloomsbury ethos. The Workshops were also closely associated with the Hogarth Press and the artist and critic Roger Fry, who was the principal figure behind the project and believed that artists could design, produce, and sell their own works, and that writers could also be their own printers and publishers. The Directors of the firm were Fry, Duncan Grant and Vanessa Bell.

== Beginnings ==
Fry aimed to remove what he considered to be the false divisions between the decorative and fine arts, and to give his artist friends an additional income opportunity in designing furniture, textiles and other household accessories. Fry was keen to encourage a Post-Impressionist influence in designs produced for Omega. However, Cubist and Fauvist influences are also apparent, particularly in many of the textile designs.

To ensure items were bought only for the quality of the work, and not the reputation of the artist, Fry insisted works be shown anonymously, marked only with the letter omega. The products were in general expensive, and aimed at an exclusive market.

== Designers and manufacturers ==
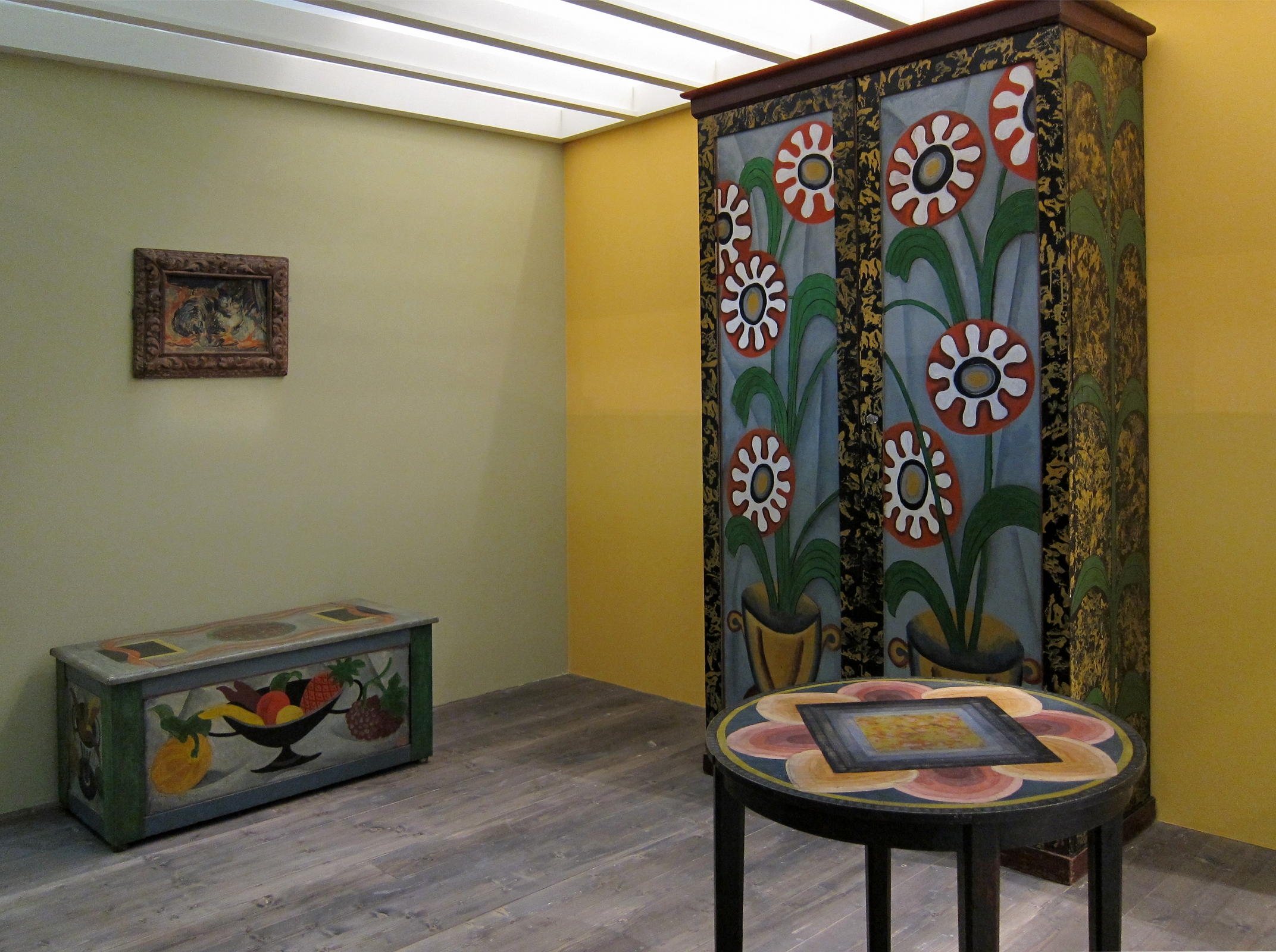
Furniture created by Roger Fry for the Omega Workshops, on display in 2009.

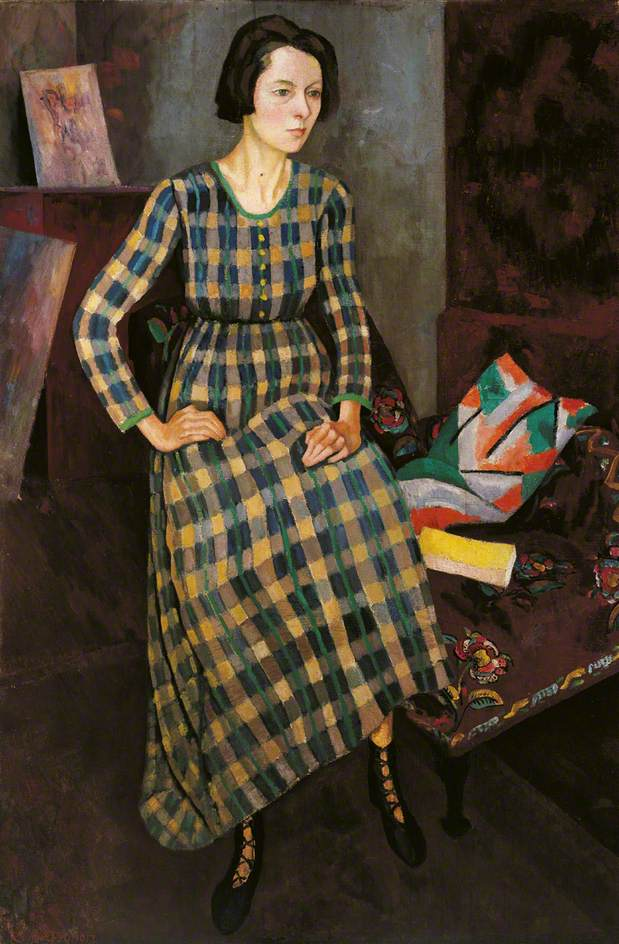
Nina Hamnett painted by Roger Fry, 1917, in a dress designed by Vanessa Bell and made at the Omega. The shoes may also be from Omega and the cushion on the chair is covered with 'Maud' linen, also by Bell.

In addition to offering a wide range of individual products, such as painted furniture, painted murals, mosaics, stained glass, and textiles, Omega Workshops offered interior design themes for various living spaces. A commission was taken to decorate a room for the 1913 Ideal Home Exhibition, and an illustrated catalogue, including text written by Fry, was published in autumn 1914.

Vanessa Bell and Duncan Grant produced designs for Omega, and Wyndham Lewis was initially part of the operation. Lewis, however, split off at an early stage, taking with him several other participants to start the rival decorative workshop Rebel Art Centre after accusing Fry of misappropriating a commission to decorate a room at the Ideal Home Exhibition in the autumn of 1913. In October 1913, Wyndham Lewis, Frederick Etchells, Edward Wadsworth and Cuthbert Hamilton announced their resignation from Omega in a letter, known as the 'Round Robin', to its shareholders and patrons. This letter contained accusations particularly against Fry, criticising the workshop's products and ideology. This split led to the formation not only of the Rebel Art Centre, but also of the Vorticist movement.

Most manufacturing for Omega was outsourced to professional craftsmen, such as J. Kallenborn & Sons of Stanhope Street, London, for marquetry furniture and Dryad Limited of Leicester for tall cane-seat chairs. A company in France was used to manufacture early printed linens.

In the autumn of 1913 Fry, who also created the designs for Omega's tall cane-seat chairs, started designing and making pottery. After he considered book design and publishing in July 1915, the superintendent of printing at Central School of Arts and Crafts collaborated with Omega in designing four books that were later outsourced for printing. The management of the Omega Workshop was passed to Winifred Gill from 1914 as the men started to become involved in the First World War.

One artist exhibitions included those of Edward McKnight Kauffer, Alvaro Guevara, Mikhail Larionov and Vanessa Bell's first solo exhibition in 1916.

The range of products continued to increase throughout Omega Workshops' six-year existence, and in April 1915 Vanessa Bell began using Omega fabrics in dress design, after which dressmaking became a successful part of the business.

Edward Wolfe worked at the Omega Workshops, hand-painting candle-shades and trays, and decorating furniture. Wolfe, who died in 1982, was one of the last of the Bloomsbury painters.

In January 1918, Omega were commissioned to design sets and costumes in the Israel Zangwill play Too Much Money.

== Closure and legacy ==
Omega closed in 1919, after a clearance sale, and was officially liquidated on 24 July 1920. A series of poor financial decisions and internal conflicts all contributed to its decline. At the time of its closure, Fry was the only remaining original member working regularly at the workshop. Despite this, Omega became influential in interior design in the 1920s.

A revival of interest in Omega designs in the 1980s led to a reassessment of the place of the Bloomsbury Group in visual arts.

== See also ==
- British art

== References and sources ==
Sources

- Christopher Reed. Bloomsbury Rooms: Modernism, Subculture, and Domesticity. Yale University Press, 2004.
