= Group X =

British artistic movement active in 1920

- Lithograph poster by E. McKnight Kauffer for the Group X exhibition 26 March – 24 April 1920
- Years active: 1920
- Location: United Kingdom
- Major figures: Frank Dobson; Edward McKnight Kauffer; Wyndham Lewis
- Influences: Vorticism

Cover of the catalogue of the Mansard Gallery exhibition

Group X was a short-lived British artistic movement in the years after the First World War, which held an exhibition in 1920 and planned others that never happened.

In 1920, some former members of the pre-War Vorticist movement abruptly left the London Group of which they had been part. Six – Jessica Dismorr, Frederick Etchells, Cuthbert Hamilton, Wyndham Lewis, William Roberts and Edward Wadsworth – were joined by the sculptor Frank Dobson, Charles Ginner, the American Edward McKnight Kauffer and John Turnbull to found Group X.

The group exhibited at the Mansard Gallery in Heal's in the Tottenham Court Road from 26 March to 24 April 1920.
