= Kathleen Dillon =

British dancer and theatre designer

Kathleen Dillon (1898-1990) was a British dancer and theatre designer.

== Life and work ==
Kathleen Dillon was born in Croydon in 1898. Her parents were Horace Robert Linn Dillon and Mary Ann Dillon (née House). Kathleen’s parents had wanted her to be a teacher but she rebelled against this decision at an early age and persuaded her mother to answer an advertisement in The Stage for child dancers. In May 1911 she was chosen by Margaret Morris and John Galsworthy as one of six children to dance in Galsworthy's play The Little Dream, with dances choreographed by Morris. Morris described the thirteen year-old as "tall and slender, with a very fair skin, and pale golden hair that hung to her shoulders; she was a serious child – devoted to her dancing – she seldom smiled, and had large, thoughtful eyes, but her full curling lips held a promise of sensuality not yet awakened." Dillon was trained in Morris's dance technique, which focused on natural, expressionistic movement with bare feet and loose clothing, in contrast to classical ballet. Dillon inspired Galsworthy to write the ballet Spring and the Four Winds, which was first performed in 1913 with Dillon in the role of Spring.

Kathleen continued to perform as one of Morris's 'Dancing Children' at Morris's club, theatre and school in Chelsea, London. She moved in with Morris and her mother and began teaching at the school. Dillon also performed with other small theatres in Chelsea, including the Greenleaf Theatre, run by Maxwell Armstrong and Constance Smedley, and the Choric School (or Clarissa Club), which she founded with Hester Sainsbury and the poet John Rodker. In May 1917 Dillon danced in the first English performance of Stravinsky's Pastorale, choreographed by Morris, at the Margaret Morris Club.

Dillon's striking Pre-Raphaelite looks inspired artists such as J.D. Fergusson, Augustus John and Maurice Lambert. Fergusson's 1916 work Rose Rhythm was inspired by a hat Dillon had made which "was not merely a hat, but a continuation of the girl’s character, her mouth, her nostril, the curl of her hair – her whole character – (feeling of her) like Burns’s ‘love is like a red red rose."

After leaving the Margaret Morris School, Dillon performed in the West-End revue Mayfair and Montmartre put on by Charles B. Cochran, but her role was usurped by the French star Delysia in May 1922. However, her involvement with Cochran continued and she danced in the operette Phi Phi in July 1922. She toured Scotland with the Arts League of Service in September and October 1924 and appeared with them in London in January 1925. Between 1926 and 1927 Dillon danced in a number of performances with the Studio Rhythme et Coleur in Paris, led by Margaret Morris's former pupils, Hélène Vanel and Loïs Hutton.

Dillon designed the costumes for Ninette de Valois' ballets Beauty and the Beast and A Daughter of Eve, both of which opened in January 1927.

== Personal life ==
Dillon had a relationship with the poet John Rodker before 1916. In June 1919 Dillon married Corris W. Evans, a solicitor, and had a son by him in 1921. In 1929 she had an affair with the artist Edward Wadsworth.

In 1931 she married the musician Angus Morrison and they had two daughters. She died in 1990.
