= 33 Fitzroy Square =

Building in London, England

Coordinates: 51.5223365°N 0.1403382°W

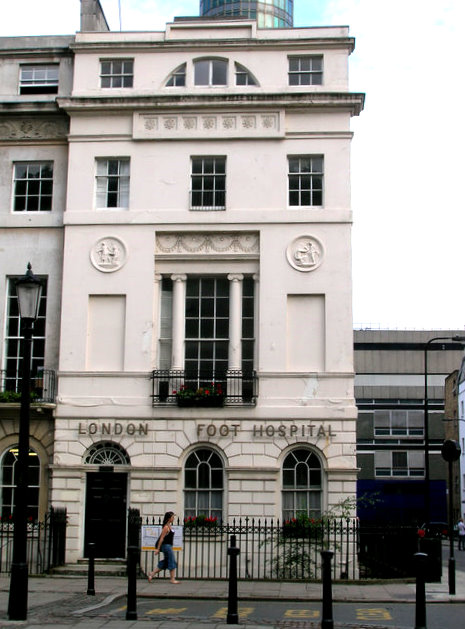
33 Fitzroy Square, from the square itself.

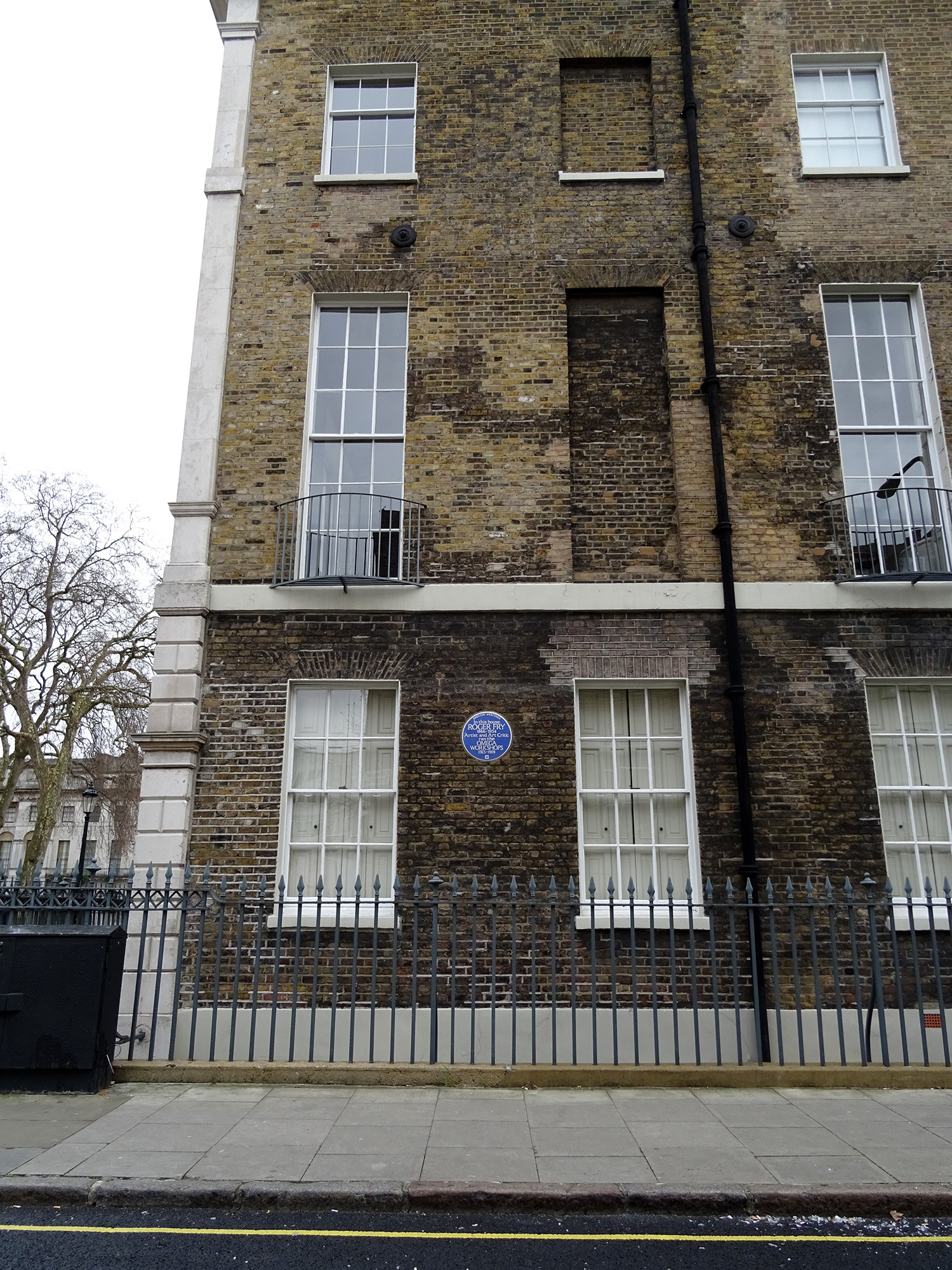
The Grafton Way side of the building, with the blue plaque to Roger Fry.

33 Fitzroy Square is a townhouse and former hospital on Fitzroy Square in the Fitzrovia district of London, England. It is most famous for having been the location of Omega Workshops, but it also housed the London Foot Hospital and School of Podiatric Medicine from 1929 to 2003, before being converted back into a single house. It is now used primarily as an events venue.

The house sits at the southern apex of Fitzroy Square, at the junction between Conway Street and Grafton Way. The house was built in 1794, designed by Robert Adam (as was the rest of the eastern and southern sides of the square) as part of a terrace of eight houses. It was used as a townhouse for the first century of its existence. The upper floors of the house were home to Eva Gore-Booth and Esther Roper from 1913.

At the same time as Gore-Booth and Roper lived upstairs, Roger Fry downstairs founded and hosted the Bloomsbury Group's Omega Workshops from 1913 to 1919. For this, it has an English Heritage blue plaque to Fry installed on the Grafton Way side of the building. Famous artists based there in that period included Vanessa Bell, Duncan Grant, Dora Carrington, and Wyndham Lewis. The premises hosted a regular Thursday night club, whose members included W. B. Yeats and George Bernard Shaw.

After the Omega Workshops went into liquidation, with the financial support of the British Chiropodical Society, the site became the London Foot Hospital. It also hosted the School of Podiatric Medicine, which was supported by University College London. It was not able to be renovated to install lifts, and its closure was mooted - including being debated in the House of Lords - in 1994. When UCL finally terminated its arrangement with the School in 2003, it was moved to Stratford to come under the remit of the University of East London, and the hospital closed. The property was sold for £10.75m in 2010.

The terrace of 33 to 40 with its attached railings has been listed Grade I on the National Heritage List for England since 1954.
