= Cuthbert Hamilton =

English painter (1885–1959)

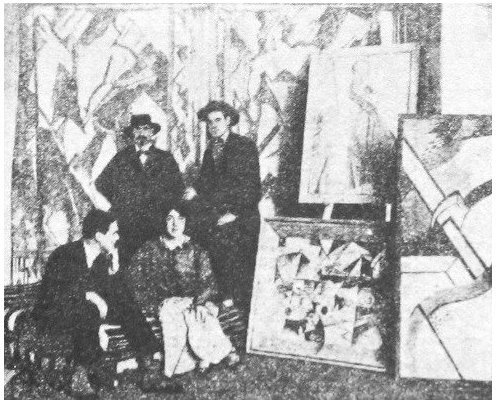
- Cuthbert Hamilton (seated), Kate Lechmere, Edward Wadsworth and Wyndham Lewis at the Rebel Art Centre, March 1914.
- Born: 1885
- Died: 1959 (aged 73–74)
- Education: Slade School of Art
- Movement: Vorticist; Group X

Cuthbert Hamilton (1885–1959) was a British artist associated with the Vorticist movement and later with Group X. He was one of the pioneers of abstract art in Britain.

Cuthbert Hamilton went to the Slade School of Art and was a contemporary of Wyndham Lewis. In 1912 he collaborated with Wyndham Lewis on decorations for the Cave of the Golden Calf nightclub, and the next year he became part of the Omega Workshops.

In 1913 Wyndham Lewis argued with Roger Fry about a commission at the Omega Workshops. Hamilton left the workshops with other artists William Roberts, Frederick Etchells, Edward Wadsworth, and Henri Gaudier-Brzeska. They all supported Wyndham Lewis and united with him in March 1914, when he started the Rebel Art Centre. The artists were later on associated with the Vorticist art movement. Hamilton was one of the names signing the Vorticist manifesto and he also contributed material to the first issue of the Vorticist magazine Blast, (illus xviii Group).

He opened the Yeoman Pottery in Kensington in 1915/16. During World War I Hamilton was a Special Constable. After the war ended, he exhibited work with a new group Group X, which had been started by Lewis and Edward McKnight Kauffer also to be an avant-garde group.

Hamilton married the daughter of a powerful insurance businessman, and in 1920 he closed the Yeoman Pottery, giving up all his artistic work. He did not take part in any art exhibitions for the remainder of his life.
