= Harley Gardens =

Street in Chelsea, London

Coordinates: 51°29′15.52″N 0°10′52.65″W

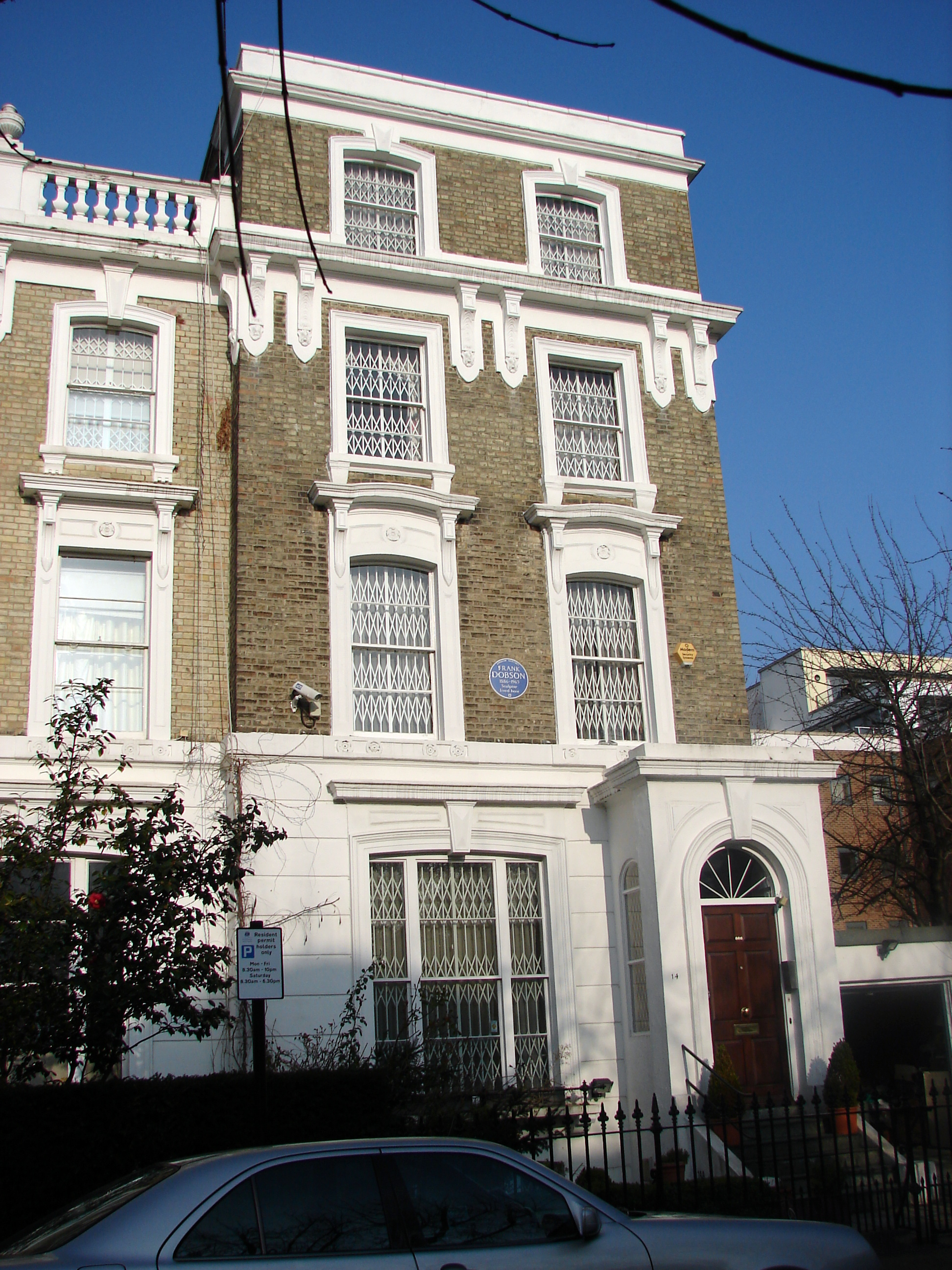
14 Harley Gardens, home to Frank Dobson

Harley Gardens is a residential street in Chelsea, London SW10. It runs roughly north to south from Priory Walk to Milborne Grove, parallel to the west of Drayton Gardens, and lies just north of Fulham Road.

== History and architecture ==
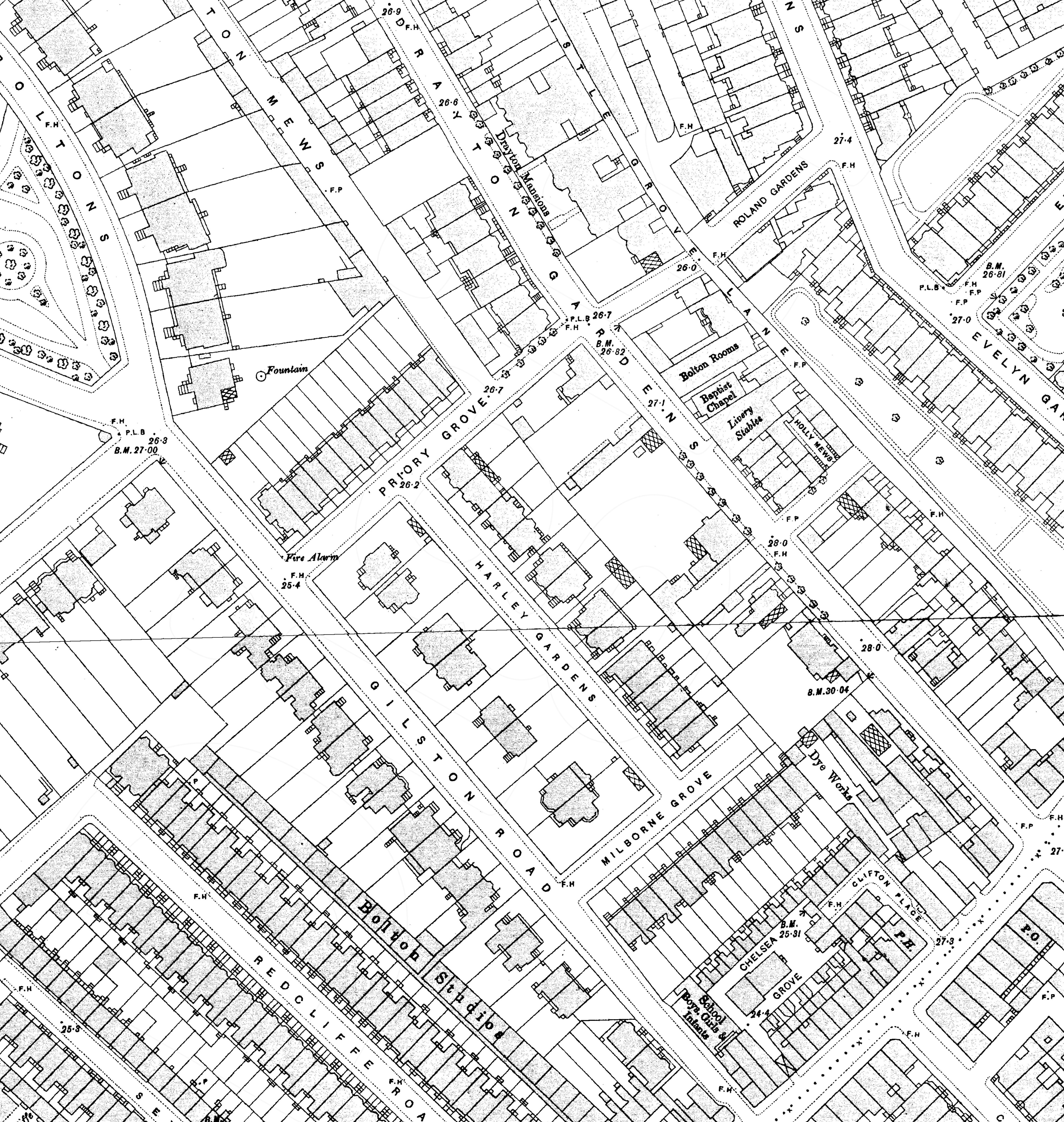
Harley Gardens (centre) on an 1890s Ordnance Survey map

Harley Gardens was built from 1851, mostly of semi-detached brick houses. Pevsner notes the "oddly undulating acanthus leaves" decorating their porch capitals. Numbers 9-14 were built in 1861–63 in a grander style and are "a richly dressed symmetrical terrace with bracketed main cornice below a parapet punctuated by urns."

== Notable buildings and residents ==
The sculptor Frank Dobson (1886–1963) lived at no 14, and is commemorated with a blue plaque.
