= Hester Sainsbury =

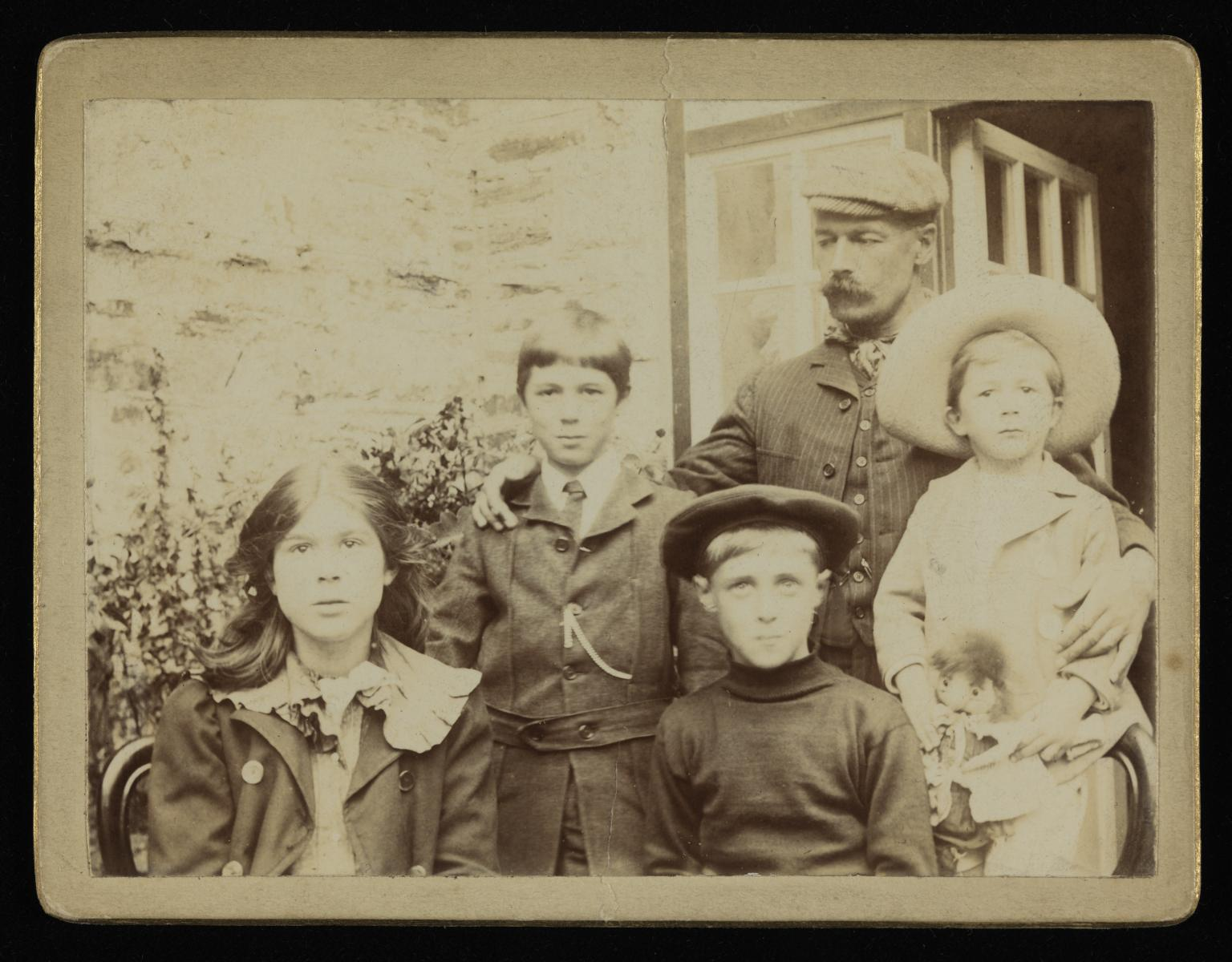
Photograph of Henry Scott Tuke with his sister's four children [c.1899] Photographer Unknown. (from left) Hester Margaret Sainsbury, William Tuke Sainsbury, Geoffrey Harrington Sainsbury, Henry Scott Tuke, Philip A Sainsbury at Mawnan Smith

Hester Margaret Sainsbury (1890-1967) was a British artist, dancer, poet and illustrator.

== Life and work ==
Hester Sainsbury's parents were Harrington Sainsbury (1853-1936), court physician to Queen Victoria, and Maria Tuke (1861–1947). They married in Marylebone parish church, London on 26 March 1889; Hester was born in the spring of 1890. She grew up among artists such as Roger Fry, Gwen Raverat and the Omega Workshop Group. Her brother Phillip was one of the founders of the Favil Press, and later ran the Cayme Press, for both of which she illustrated several books.

She was trained in modern dance by Margaret Morris. Around 1914-1915, she ran a group "formed to speak and act her amazingly vital rhythmic verse-plays", influencing the development of artistic drama in Britain, and inspiring people such as the artist Maxwell Armfield. Her group was known before the war as the Clarissa Club, which she and another dancer, Kathleen Dillon founded and ran at 71 Royal Hospital Road, Chelsea. By 1914 its name had changed to the Choric School. The whole of the October 1915 issue of Others magazine was devoted to "The Choric School", with contributions by Sainsbury and the poets Ezra Pound, Kathleen Dillon and John Rodker.

Sainsbury became a successful artist and print-maker in the 1920s, being known among other things for using an engraving tool that cut multiple parallel lines rather than the usual one. She made fine art prints and illustrations by engraving both copper and wood. The author Philip Neil describes her engravings as "fresh, supple, and irresistibly charming."

She lived the Bohemian life of an artist; her lover was the Japanese playwright Kori Torahiko between 1917 and 1926, when he died. She married the Vorticist painter Frederick Etchells on 13 May 1932; she illustrated a number of books for his company, Haslewood Books. She and Etchells moved away from London's artistic scene to France House, East Hagbourne, Oxfordshire, which he personally restored. ,

In the 1930s she and Etchells purchased a weekend cottage in West Challow then called Holme Lea, a Queen Anne property. They lived at Holme Lea between 1939 and 1944. During that time they acquired and renovated another house in West Challow into which she, her husband and daughter moved, in 1944.

Her artistic career largely came to an end on moving to Berkshire, though she illustrated an edition of Torahiko Kori's works, published in Tokyo in 1936. John Betjeman was one of their neighbours.

== Works ==
=== Books ===
- Poems (1916), [printed for Phillip Sainsbury].
- Holy women: and other poems and wood cuts (1921), Favil Press.
- Meanderlane: tales and wood engravings (1925), Cayme Press.
- Noah's ark (1926, reprinted Nov. 1926), Cayme Press.

=== Books illustrated ===
The cover of the first edition of Henry Williamson's Tarka the Otter featured one of her wood engravings.

- Belloc, Hilaire (1926). Mrs. Markham's new history of England, Cayme Press.
- Savile, George (1927). The Lady's New-Years-Gift; or, Advice to a daughter, Cayme Press.
- Taylor, John; Macdonald, Hugh (1927). A dog of war, F. Etchells & H. Macdonald.
- "F., A." (1928). The Ladies' pocket book of etiquette, Golden Cockerel Press.
- Holland, Henry Richard Vassall (1928). Eve's legend, F. Etchells & H. Macdonald.
- Andersen, Hans Christian (1929). Tales from Hans Andersen, F. Etchells & H. Macdonald.
- Ovid; Boas, Frederick S. (1928). The Heroycall epistles of the learned poet Publius Ovidius Naso, London.
- Morand, Paul; Roche, Charles-Emile (translator) (1928). Earth Girdled, A.A. Knopf. Original title Rien que la terre.
- Hughes-Stanton, Blair (1929). The Apocrypha : according to the authorized version with wood-engravings, Cresset Press.
- Hill, John (1930). Lucina sine concubitu, Golden Cockerel Press.
- Mathers, Edward Powys (1927–1930). Eastern Love, 12 volumes, translated from the Arabic; J. Rodker for subscribers.
- Kori, Torahiko (1936). Complete works of Torahiko Kori, Tokyo: Sogensha Press.
- Roth, Samuel (1947). Halfway, New York.

=== In museums and galleries ===
- British Museum (prints from 1922–1931)
