= London Pride (sculpture) =

Sculpture by Frank Dobson in London

Coordinates: 51°30′27.42″N 0°6′53.15″W

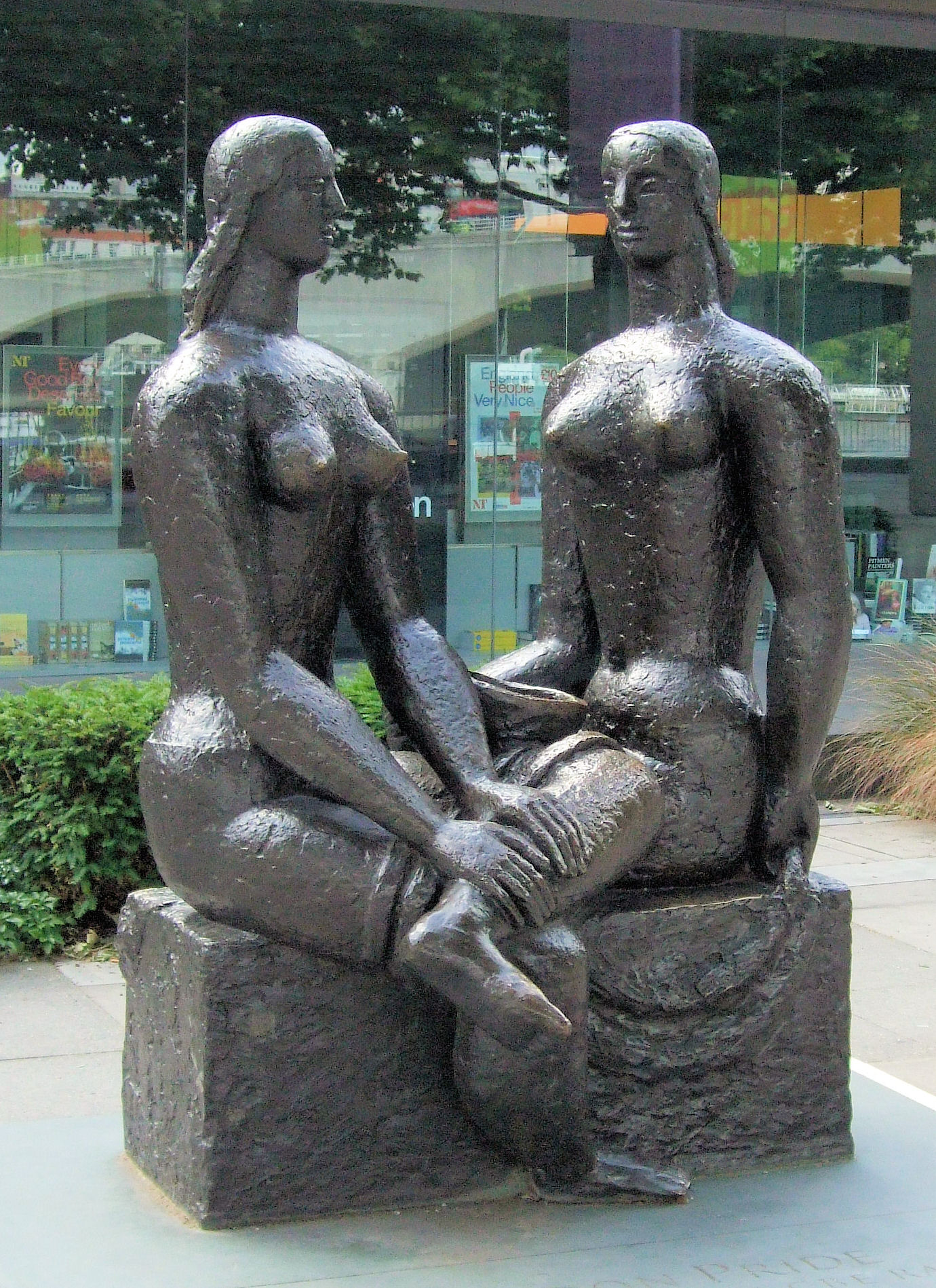
- The sculpture in 2009
- Artist: Frank Dobson
- Year: 1951 (cast c. 1987)
- Type: Sculpture
- Medium: Bronze
- Location: London, United Kingdom

London Pride is a sculpture by the British artist Frank Dobson located on Queen's Walk on London's South Bank. The sculpture was given Grade II listed status in January 2016. The sculpture depicts two nude women, it sits on a slate platform, with an inscription carved by David Kindersley in front of the piece that reads:

'LONDON PRIDE / FRANK DOBSON CBE RA / 1886–1963 / Commissioned for / THE FESTIVAL OF BRITAIN 1951 / GIVEN BY MARY DOBSON 1987 / AND PLACED ON THE SOUTH BANK / Assisted generously by Lynton Property & Revisionary Plc and / The Henry Moore Foundation / ARTS COUNCIL OF GREAT BRITAIN'.

Dobson intended for the bowl in one of the figure's hands to be planted with Saxifraga urbium, commonly known as London Pride.
