= Frank Dobson (sculptor) =

British sculptor (1886–1963)

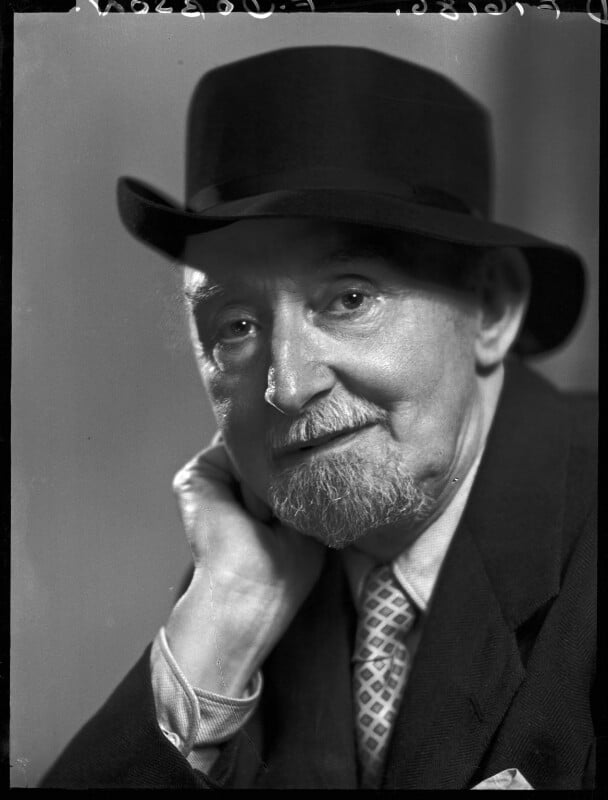
- Dobson in 1953
- Born: 18 November 1886; London, England
- Died: 22 July 1963 (aged 76); Princess Beatrice Hospital London
- Education: Hastings School of Art; Hospitalfield House; City and Guilds of London Art School
- Known for: sculpture, drawing

Frank Owen Dobson CBE RA (18 November 1886 – 22 July 1963) was a British artist and sculptor and during his time was considered one of the best sculptors in Europe. He was a contemporary of Jacob Epstein and Henry Moore.

Dobson is now seen as one of the most important British sculptors of the 20th century.

== Early life ==
Dobson was born in central London and grew up in Clerkenwell. His mother was Alice Mary Owen and his father, who was also named Frank Dobson, was a commercial artist who specialized in bird and flower designs for greeting card companies. The younger Dobson attended school in Forest Gate and then in Harrow. When his father died in 1900, the fourteen year old Dobson was sent to live with an aunt in Hastings. There he attended evening classes at the Hastings School of Art and was then trained as an apprentice with Sir William Reynolds-Stephens. After eighteen months in Reynolds-Stephen's studio, Dobson moved to Devon and then to Cornwall where he lived, for two years, by selling landscape paintings. In 1906 he obtained a scholarship to study at the art institute in Hospitalfield House in Arbroath and studied there for four years. From 1910 to 1912 Dobson attended the City and Guilds of London Art School in Kennington, after which he returned to Cornwall. In Newlyn, he met Augustus John who used his influence and contacts to enable Dobson to stage a one-man show at the Chenil Gallery in London in 1914. In, or around, 1915 Dobson created his first sculpture, a small piece in wood.

== World War One ==
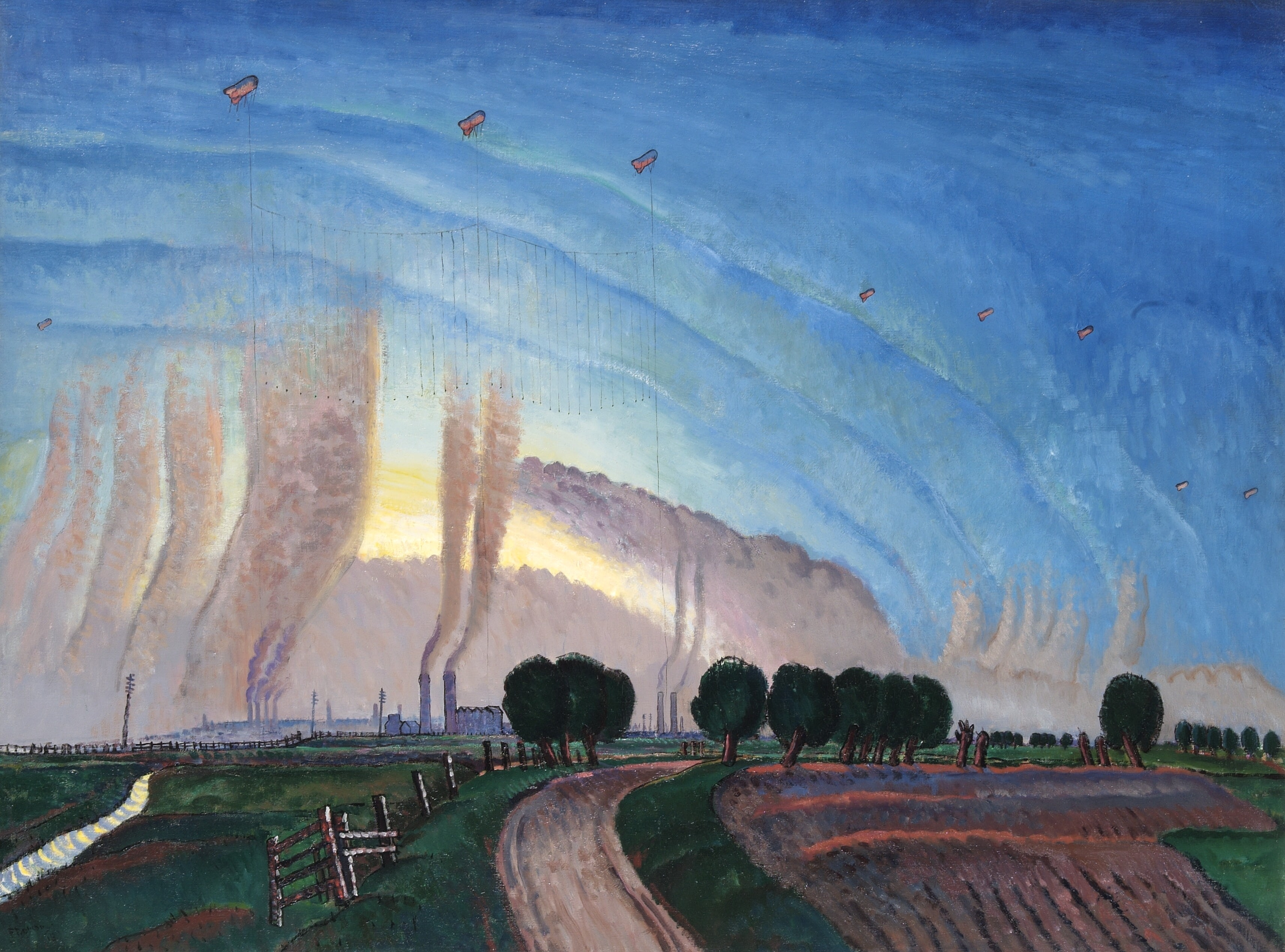
The Balloon Apron (1918) (Art.IWM ART2001)

In 1915, during the First World War, Dobson enlisted in The Artists Rifles and served in France from October 1916 as a Lieutenant with the 5th Border Regiment. In January 1917 he developed a duodenal ulcer and returned to England. In April 1918 he married Cordelia Clara Tregurtha, whom he had first met in Newlyn. Dobson was formally invalided out of the Army in November 1918 and by then had already submitted several drawings to the British War Memorials Committee and was commissioned to paint a barrage balloon site on the Thames estuary. The Air Force representatives on the Committee did not approve of the picture and Dobson did not receive any further official commissions. Dobson set up a studio in the Tregurtha family home in Newlyn but towards the end of the war he took a studio in Manresa Road in Chelsea and would live there until the start of the Second World War.

== Inter-war years ==
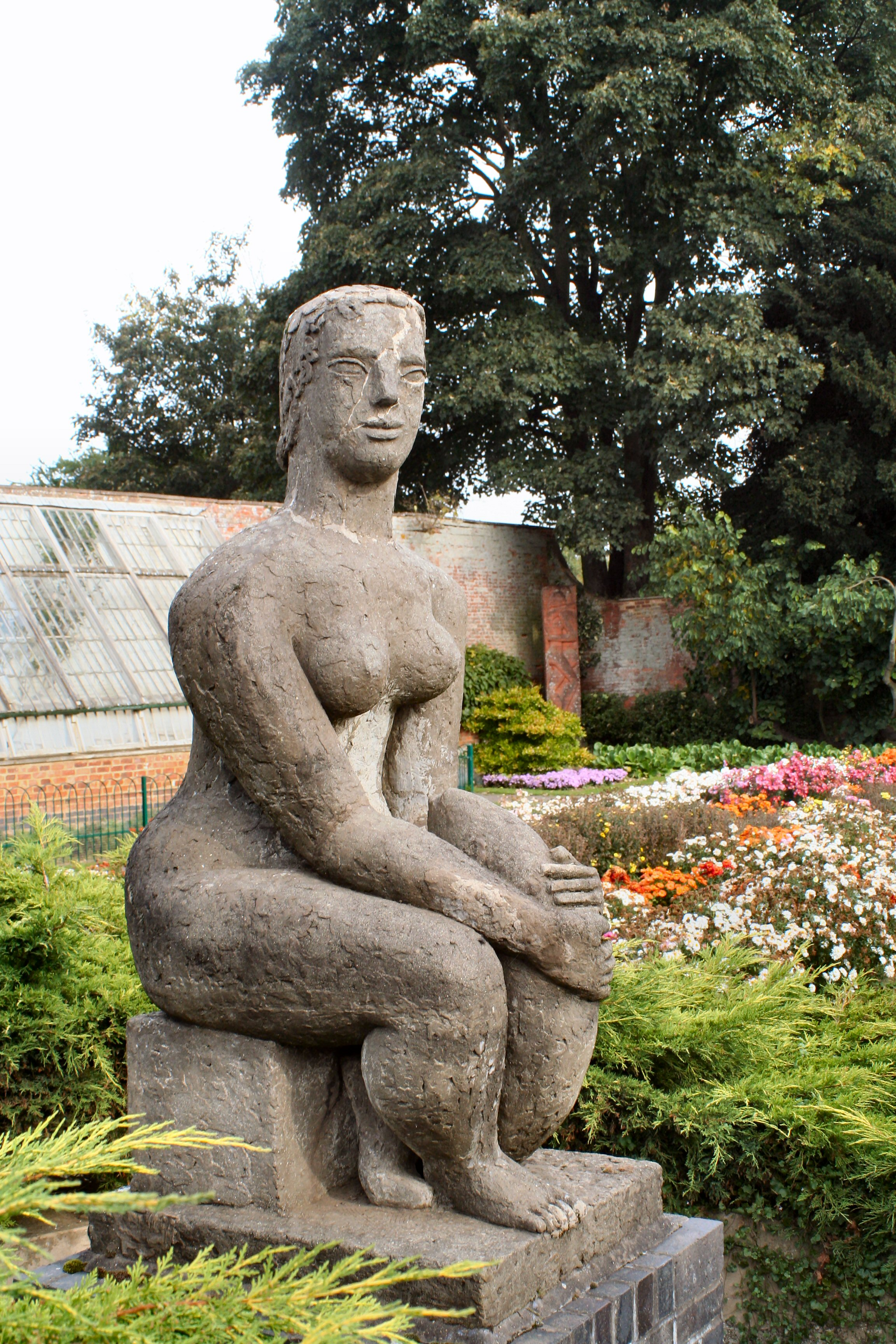
Woman and the Fish at Delapré Abbey, Northampton

Dobson began as a painter, and his early work was influenced by cubism, vorticism, and futurism. After World War I, however, he turned increasingly toward sculpture in a more or less realist style. Throughout the 1920s and the early 1930s he built a reputation as an outstanding sculptor and was among the first in Britain to prefer direct carving of the material rather than modelling a maquette first. The simplified forms and flowing lines of much of his sculptures, particularly his female nudes, showed the influence of African art.

Throughout the 1920s Dobson focused increasingly on sculpture, exhibited work in several influential exhibitions and played a leading role in a number of artistic groups. He was the only sculptor to take part in the 1920 Group X exhibition. Dobson was a founding member of the London Artists Association and spent three years as President of the London Group between 1923 and 1927. He made bronze portraits of several public figures. At the Group X exhibition he exhibited two sculptures and studies of Ben Nicholson and his bronze head of H. H. Asquith was shown at the Leicester Galleries in late 1921. Other subjects included Osbert Sitwell, Lydia Lopokova and Tallulah Bankhead. Dobson exhibited at the Venice Biennale in both 1924 and in 1926, was featured in the 1925 Tri-National Exhibition which visited London, Paris and New York and was also included in the 1926 European artists exhibition that toured America and Canada. In March 1927 he had his first major one-man exhibition when the Leicester Galleries exhibited twenty-three of his sculptures and several bronzes.

In 1930 the Tate purchased a larger-than-life sculpture from Dobson and erected it outside the gallery on Millbank. During the early 1930s Dobson continued to receive portrait commissions, most notably for Sir Edward Marsh and the actress Margaret Rawlings. Dobson worked in other media including textiles and silver, as well. His silver gilt cup, Calix Majestatis, to mark the coronation of George VI and Queen Elizabeth is now in the Royal Collection. During 1933 Dobson fractured his left arm which greatly limited his ability for heavy carving and his last monumental stone carving was to be Pax, which was first shown at the London Group in 1935.

== World War Two and later ==
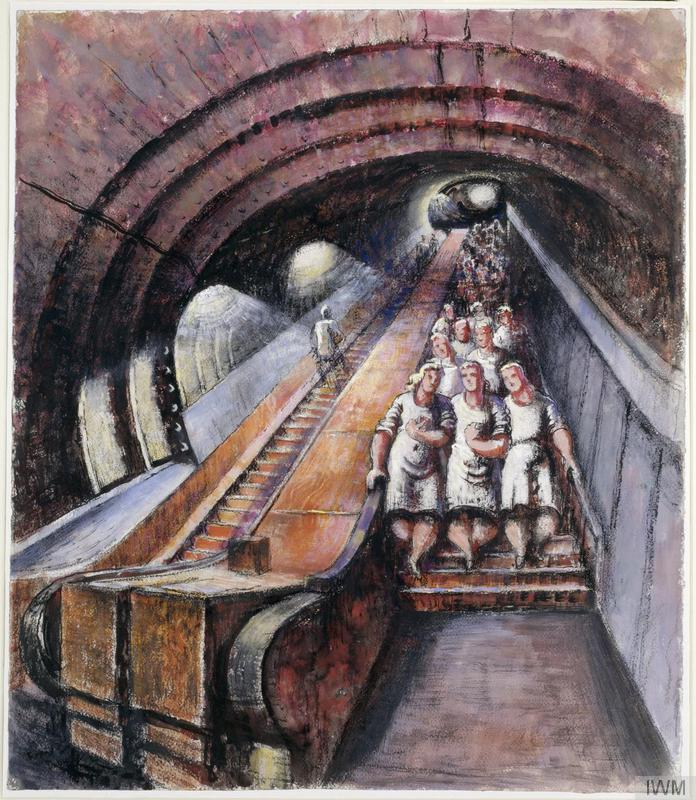
An Escalator in an Underground Factory (1944) (Art.IWM ART LD 4142)

At the start of World War Two, Dobson and his second wife [Caroline] Mary Bussell, whom he had married in 1931, moved to Bristol, where a large retrospective of his work was held in March 1940. Dobson lived in the city throughout the Bristol Blitz and like several other artists painted the ruins of churches destroyed in the bombing. Dobson contacted the War Artists' Advisory Committee and offered his services as both a painter and sculptor. WAAC were reluctant to offer sculpture commissions but eventually did offer Dobson a short-term contract for two portrait busts of Naval personnel. Later WAAC commissioned some paintings, including one of workers arriving for work at a factory that had been relocated to a tunnel.

Dobson was appointed head of sculpture at the Royal College of Art in 1946, a post he held until his retirement in 1953. For the Festival of Britain site on the South Bank of the Thames in 1951, Dobson created London Pride. The sculpture was originally exhibited as a plaster cast but was later, after Dobson died, cast as a bronze and placed in front of the Royal National Theatre in 1987. Among his last commissions were a bronze head of Sir Thomas Lipton and the zodiac clock on the exterior wall of Bracken House in London.

== Legacy ==
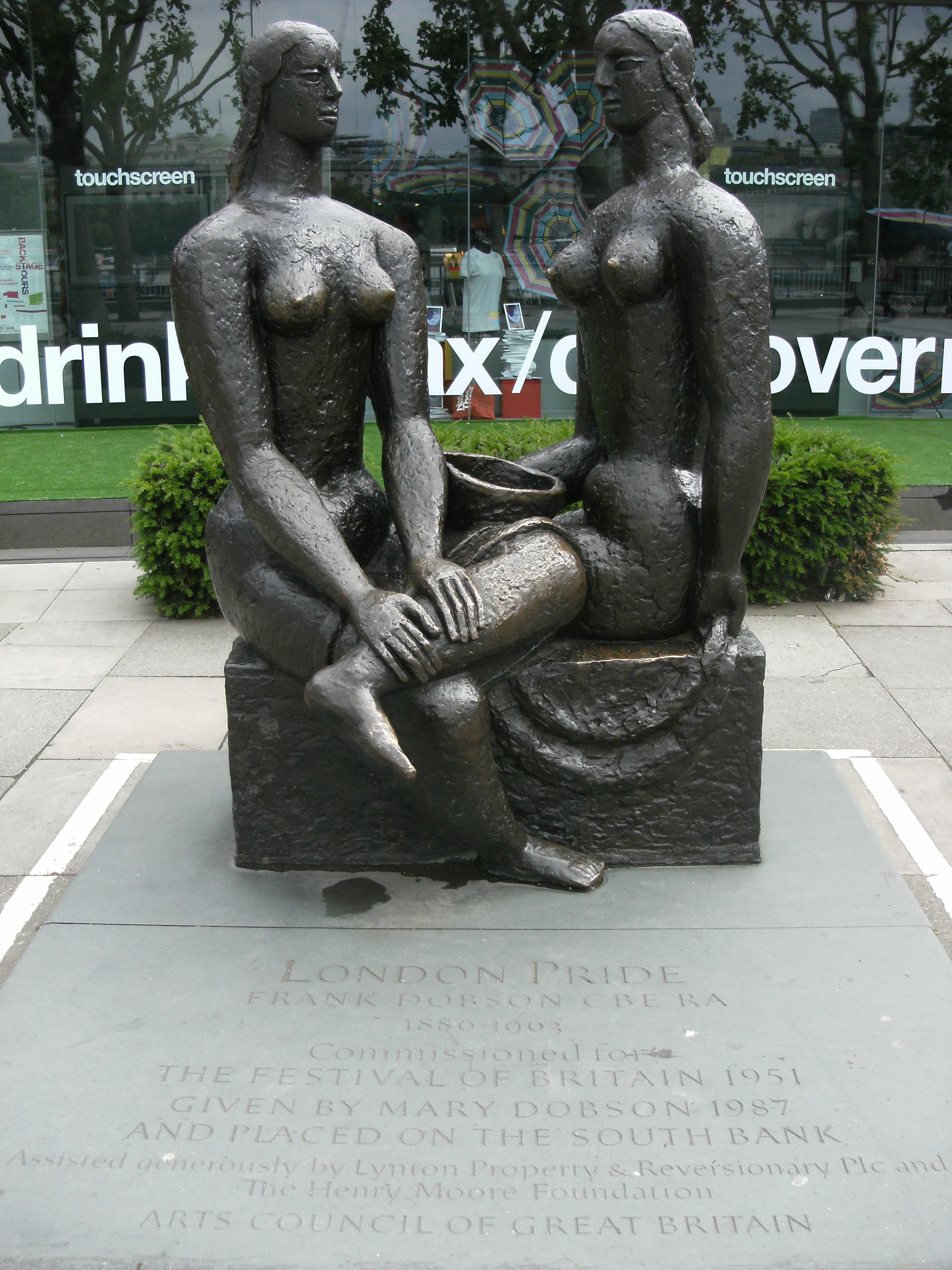
London Pride outside the National Theatre, London

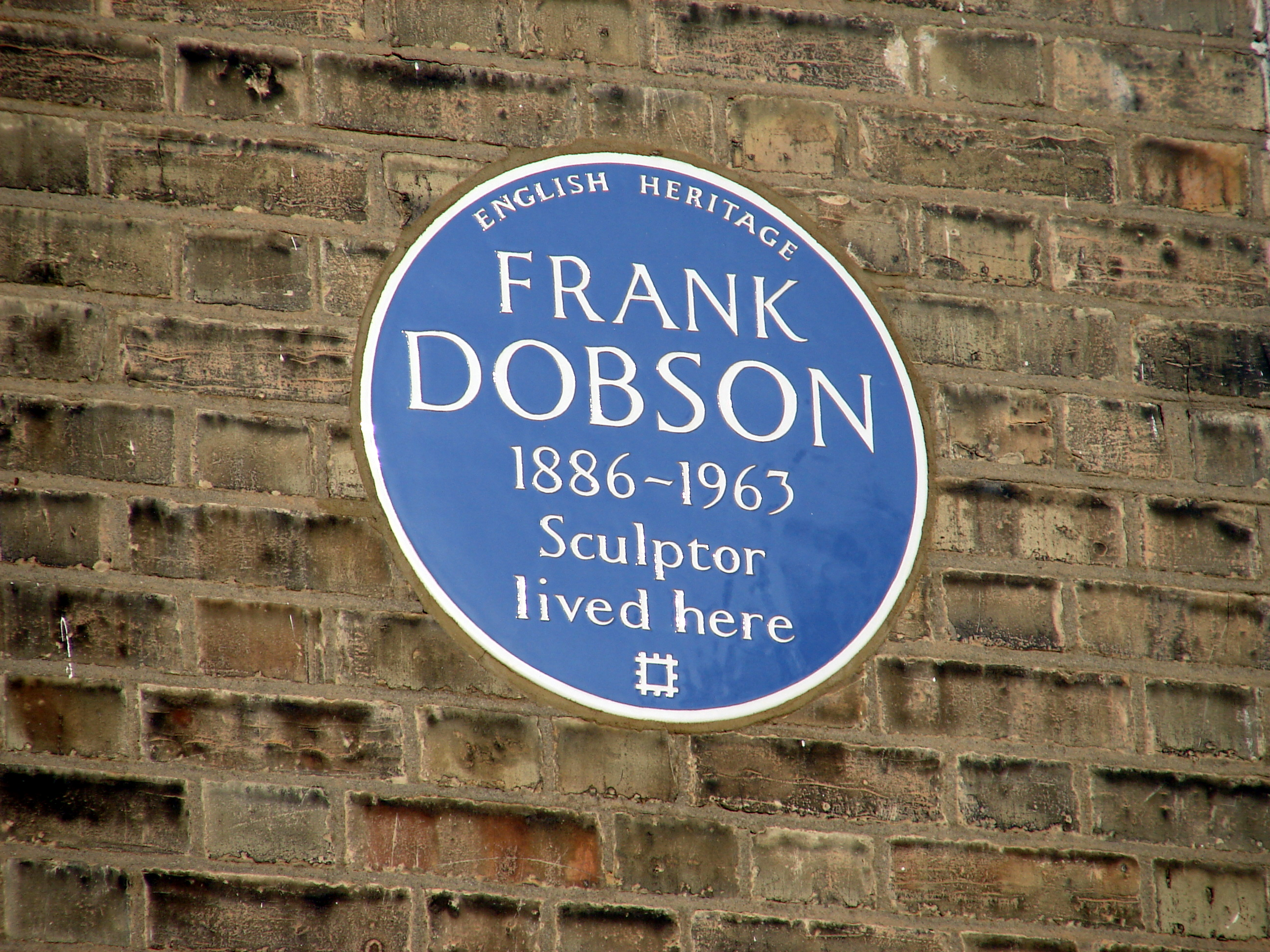
Frank Dobson blue plaque at 14 Harley Gardens, Chelsea, London

Dobson died in 1963 and his ashes were scattered in the Thames.

In 1995 the art critic Brian Sewell recalled the great loss of much of Dobson's work after his death: "After his death, his widow asked me to help her clear the studio at Stamford Bridge, and I was appalled at the destruction that she wrought, smashing to smithereens small clay and terracotta models, tearing fine drawings in red and black chalk, hundreds of them, buring [sic?] the fragments in a dustbin, all because the subjects were erotic. I was allowed to save pastel drawings of exotic and rare birds, and watercolours of farmyards and a pastoral life long gone, but for the figures engaged in sexual congress, face to face, head to toe and doggy style as explicit as any by his old friend Eric Gill, Mrs Dobson would accept no plea that they were beautiful, no argument that they were fired by a quality not to be found in the "pure essence" of the torsos that survive, and like a ferociously implacable angel at the Last Judgment, she bent to the business of destruction."

Frank Dobson Square was constructed by London County Council in 1963, the year of Dobson's death to commemorate his life and work. The centrepiece of the square was the Woman and Fish fountain, a sculpture designed and completed by Dobson in 1951.

While Dobson was one of the most esteemed artists of his time, after his death his reputation declined with the move towards postmodernism and conceptual art. However, in recent years a revival has begun.
