= Dazzle-ships in Drydock at Liverpool =

1919 painting by Edward Wadsworth

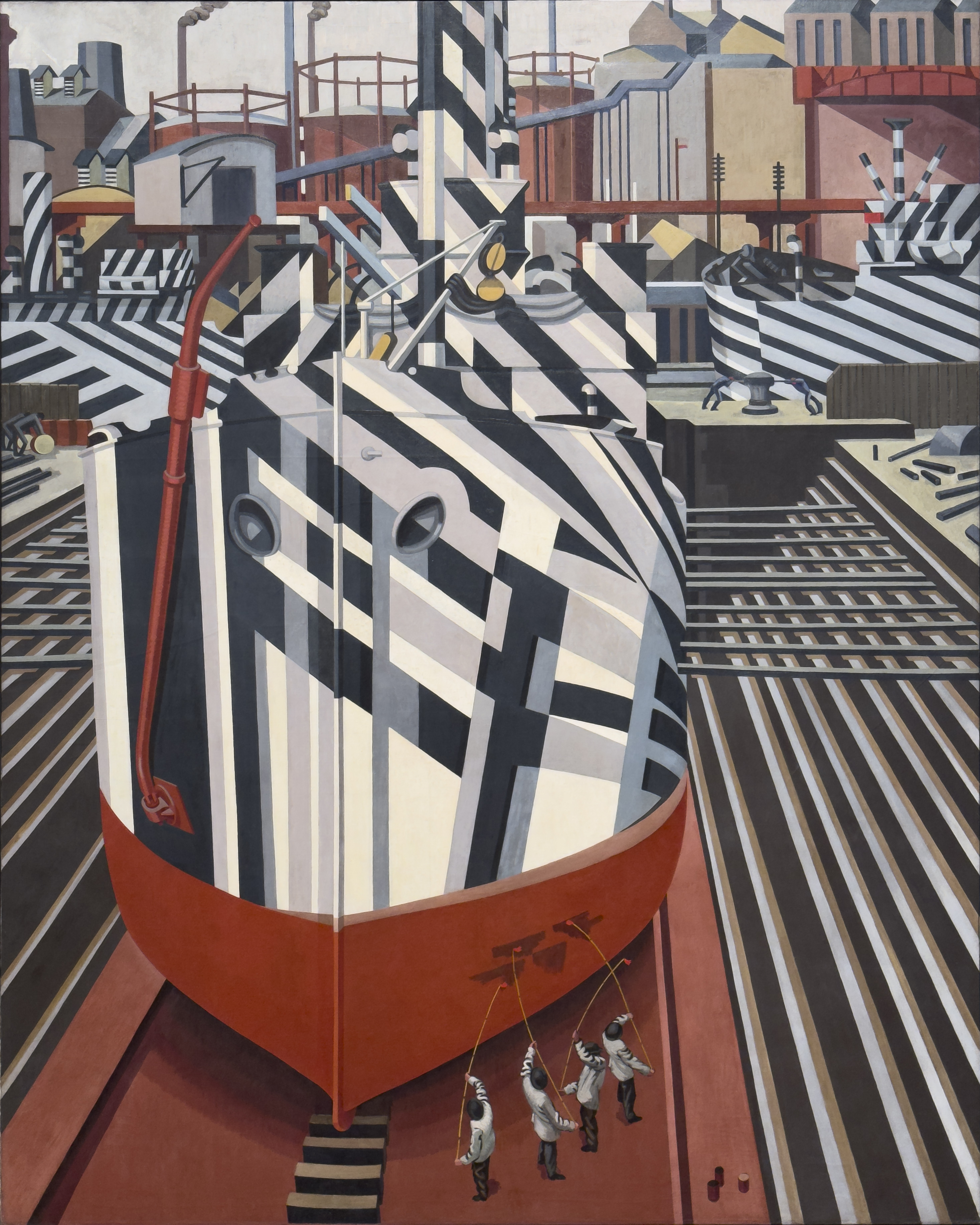
- Artist: Edward Wadsworth
- Year: 1919
- Medium: Oil on canvas
- Dimensions: 304.8 cm × 243.8 cm (120.0 in × 96.0 in)
- Location: National Gallery of Canada; Ottawa

Dazzle-ships in Drydock at Liverpool is a 1919 oil painting by the English artist Edward Wadsworth. It is one of Wadsworth's most famous paintings and depicts a freshly painted vessel with dazzle camouflage in dry dock.

== Background ==
Wadsworth had been involved with Vorticism, an abstract art movement led by Wyndham Lewis, before he was employed to design dazzle camouflage for ships during World War I. This experience forms the background for Dazzle-ships in Drydock at Liverpool.

== Legacy ==
The graphic designer Peter Saville was struck by the painting and suggested the title for the album Dazzle Ships by Orchestral Manoeuvres in the Dark. Saville designed the album's cover and used Wadsworth's painting as inspiration.
