= Frank Dobson Square =

Square in London, England

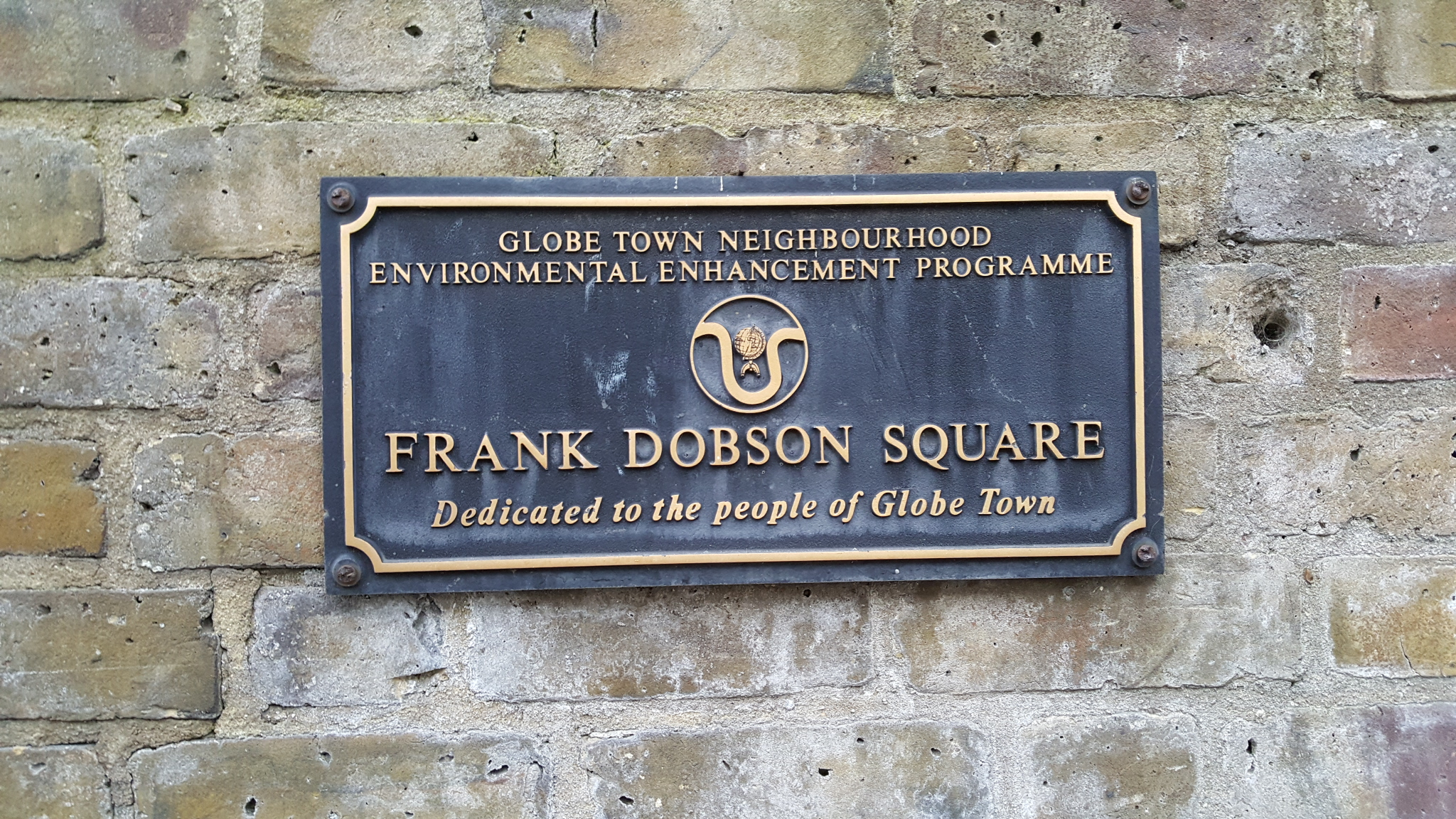

- Location within London Borough of Tower Hamlets
- Location: Whitechapel, London
- Coordinates: 51.5229°N 0.0546°W

Frank Dobson Square is a public square in Whitechapel, in the London Borough of Tower Hamlets. It commemorates the life and work of British artist and sculptor Frank Owen Dobson.

The square was constructed by the London County Council in 1963, the year of Dobson’s death, at the junction of Cambridge Heath Road and Cephas Street. Dobson had been born in Clerkenwell. The centrepiece of the square was the ‘Woman and Fish’ fountain, a sculpture designed and completed by Dobson in 1951. The sculpture had been purchased for the borough by London County Council in 1963.

The ‘Woman and Fish’ had provided drinking water until 1977, when the fountain was seriously damaged in an act of vandalism. In 1979, the sculpture was temporarily removed from the square for restoration, following further vandalism when the head of the statue was removed. In 1983, the statue was again vandalised and subject to further repairs. In 2002, the fountain was removed from the square altogether, following another act of vandalism which left it damaged beyond repair. The piece is now on the list of lost pieces of public art in London.

In December 2006, the artist Antonio Lopez Reche was given a grant by the Tower Hamlets Council Art Department to reproduce the 'Woman and Fish' statue, following Dobson’s original design. However, unlike the original statue the reproduction was cast in bronze, patinated and contains no fountain. Today, Frank Dobson Square stands empty, Reche's 'Woman and Fish' having been installed in Millwall Park, Tower Hamlets.
