= London Foot Hospital =

Podiatric clinic and school

Coordinates: 51°31′21″N 0°08′22″W

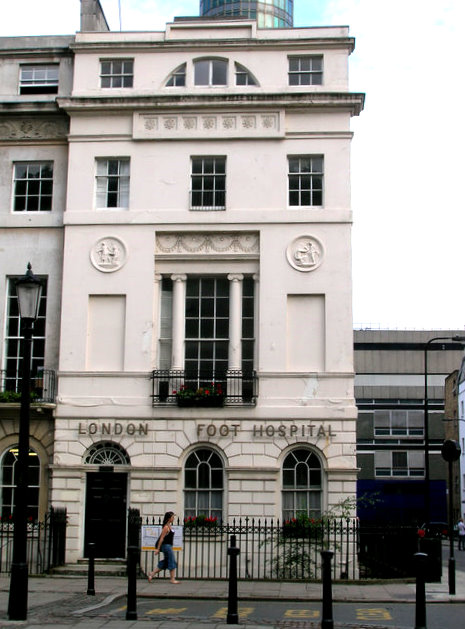
33 Fitzroy Square

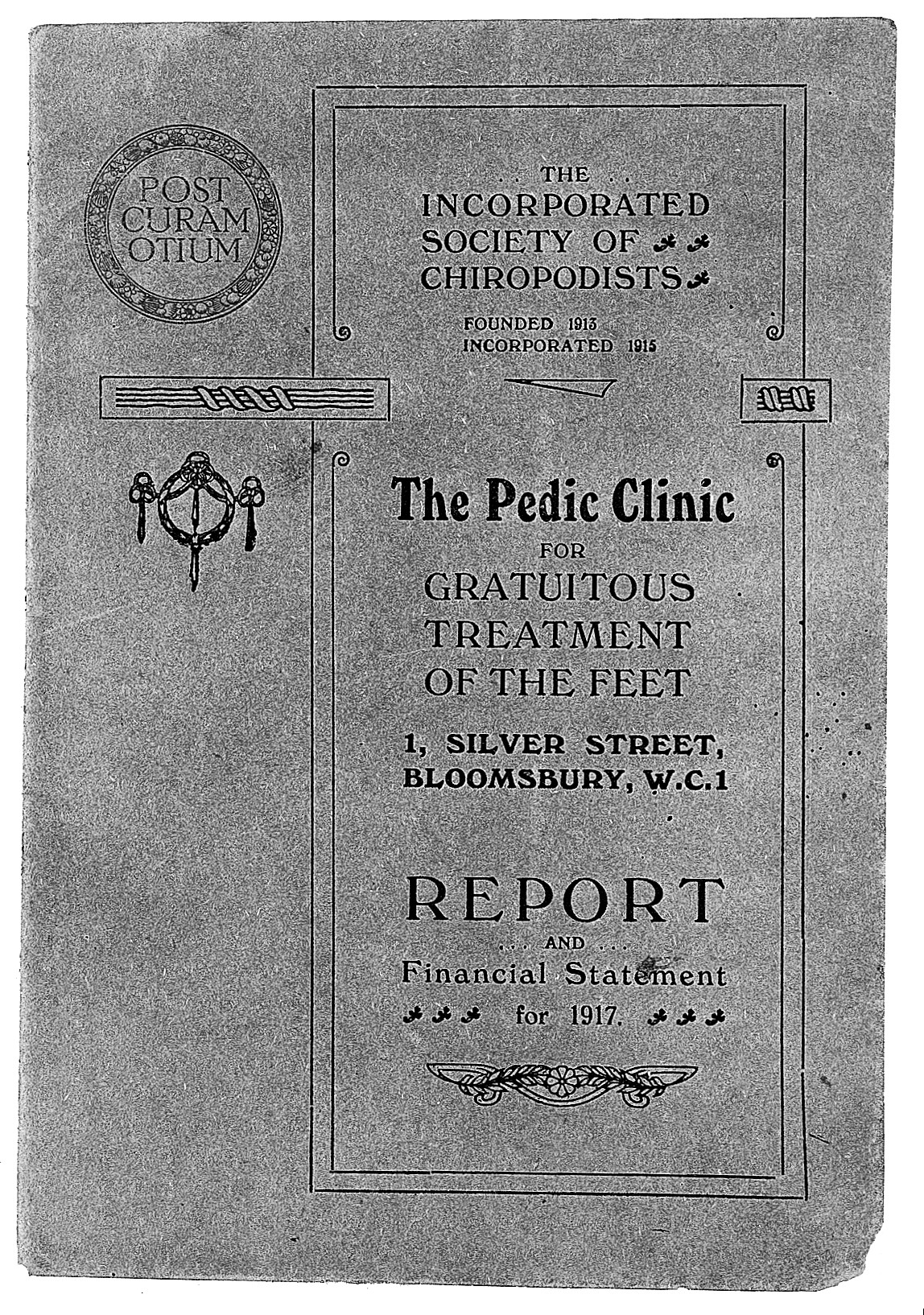
The annual report for 1917

The London Foot Hospital was founded in 1913 as The Pedic Clinic for Gratuitous Treatment of the Feet. It was the first free clinic for treatment of feet in England, and its School of Podiatric Medicine, which started as evening classes in 1919, provided the first systematic education in chiropody.

The Pedic Clinic started in Silver Street and then moved to Charlotte Street, where it was renamed the London Foot Hospital. The premises at 33 Fitzroy Square were acquired in 1929 and became the main home of the hospital until it was closed in 2003. The hospital later expanded into number 40 Fitzroy Square, at the other end of the terrace, which was formerly the London Skin Hospital. The building at number 33 became a Grade I listed building in 1954, and the other hospital buildings on the south side of Fitzroy Square were added to the listing in 1974.
