= Frederick Etchells =

English painter

- Born: 14 September 1886; Newcastle upon Tyne, England
- Died: 16 August 1973 (aged 87); Folkestone, England
- Education: Royal College of Art
- Known for: Painting, Architecture, Book Publishing, Church Restorations
- Movement: Vorticism, Omega Workshops, Group X

Frederick Etchells (14 September 1886 – 16 August 1973) was an English artist and architect.

== Biography ==
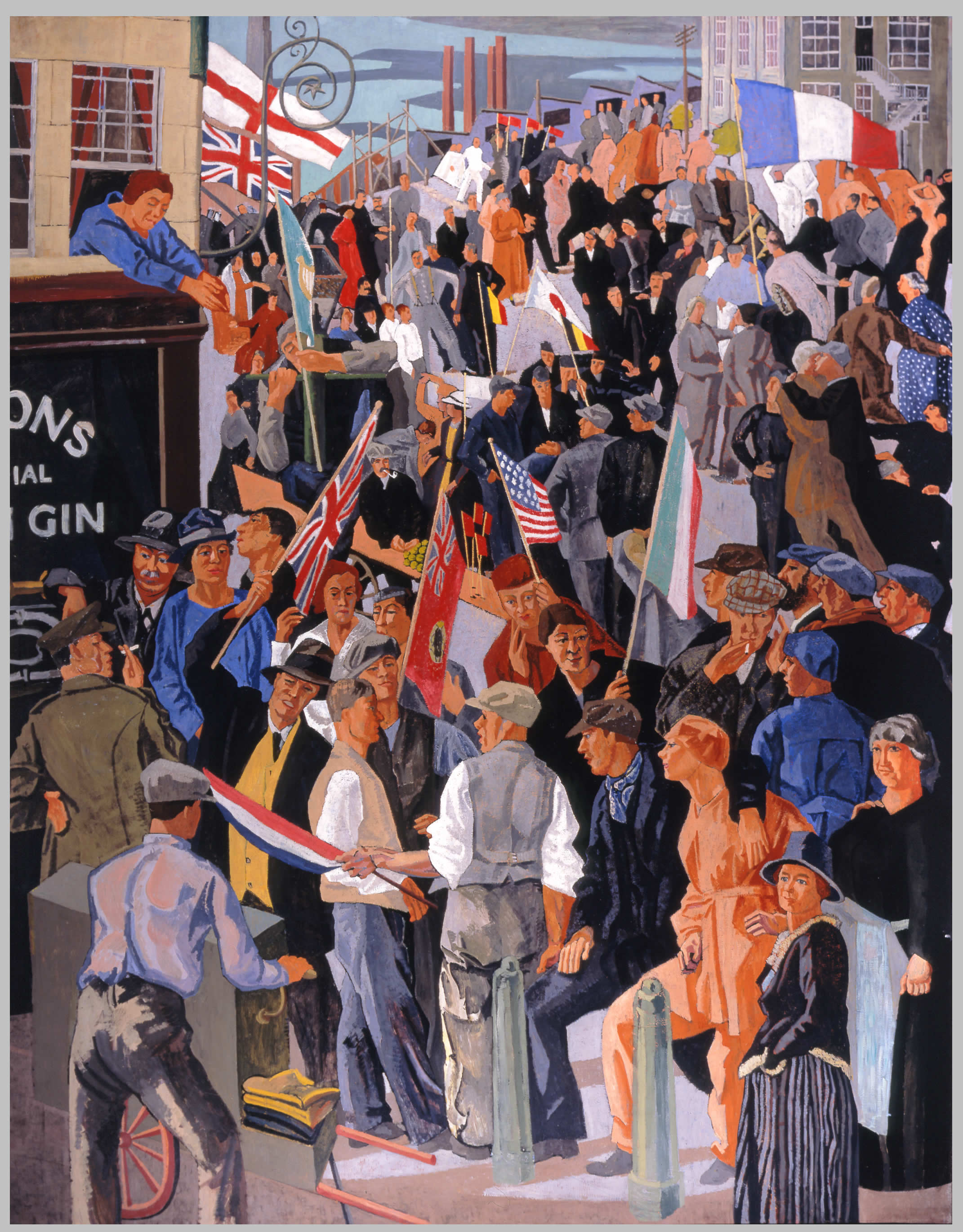
Armistice Day, Munitions Centre by Frederick Etchells

Etchells was born in Newcastle upon Tyne. He was educated at the London School of Kensington, now The Royal College of Art, where he studied on the Architectural course under Arthur Beresford Pite and William Lethaby. This brought him into contact with the Bloomsbury Group.

He was a contributor to the Omega Workshops, but eventually broke with Wyndham Lewis. This break culminated in the establishment of the Rebel Art Centre and the Rebel Art Movement, somewhat akin to the Dadaists in Paris. The Rebel Art Movement transformed into the Vorticists and several of his illustrations appeared in issues of the associated literary magazine BLAST. William Roberts painted Etchells holding the copy of BLAST in his "The Vorticists at the Restaurant de la Tour Eiffel, Spring 1915". Etchells eventually decided he no longer wanted anything to do with the movement. Unlike many of the others from the Vorticists, he remained acquainted with Roger Fry.

In his architectural practice, Etchells produced some modernist buildings. the most well-known are his designs for 232–4 High Holborn, London (1929–30) for the advertising firm WS Crawford Ltd., a commission he had obtained through his friend Ashley Havinden (1903–73) who was the company’s art director from 1929. This was the first fully modernist office building in central London. Its clean façade was matched by a modern interior, complete with built-in furniture and stainless steel. Etchells's main responsibility was the façade.

He gradually moved into architecture after a period of book publication, with the Haslewood Press. Later he became a church and conservation architect. He had close associations with John Betjeman who wrote his obituary. Betjeman was a tenant in one of Etchells's flats in Mayfair, this was during the period when Betjeman was a journalist with The Architectural Review. One of his restorations was St Andrew's Church, Plymouth; he also restored St George's Church, Donnington, West Sussex after a fire in 1939, and St James's Church, Abinger Common, Surrey in 1950 after bomb damage during World War II.

He contributed articles to the journal The Studio., though often anonymously and to Artwork.

He was an active member of the Society for the Protection of Ancient Buildings (SPAB) and a founding member of the Georgian Group.

In the 1930s Etchells purchased a weekend cottage in West Challow then called Holme Lea, a Queen Anne property. He lived there between 1939 and 1944, having moved out of London. During that time he acquired and renovated a second smaller house in West Challow into which he, his wife and daughter moved in 1944.

He was married to Hester Margaret Sainsbury who was a book illustrator, painter and artist known for her performances to music.

=== Translating Le Corbusier ===
Etchells's most significant work is his controversial 1927 English translation of Le Corbusier's Vers une architecture, which he (erroneously) translated as Towards a New Architecture. Other major errors and omissions include the translation of volume as "mass" and the disappearance of Corbusier's original French introduction (replaced with 12 pages of Etchells's own devising) and a passage in the maisons en série essay. Etchells later translated Corbusier's Urbanisme as The City of Tomorrow.

== Sources ==
- Aldham, Dinah Frederick Etchells, Artist and Architect. London, Architectural Association (dissertation), 1977.
- Dickson, Malcolm. Etchells (1886–1973). London, Architectural Association Library (thesis), 2005.https://aaschool.academia.edu/MalcolmDickson
- Ind, Rosy & Wilson, Andrew "Frederick Etchells: Plain Homebuilder Where is your Vortex?" International Centrum voor Structuranalyse en Constructivisme. (ICSAC) Cahier 9/9: Vorticism. Brussels: 1988.
- Nairn, Ian; Pevsner, Nikolaus (1965). The Buildings of England: Sussex. Harmondsworth: Penguin Books. ISBN 0-14-071028-0.
- Nairn, Ian; Pevsner, Nikolaus (1971) [1962]. The Buildings of England: Surrey (2nd ed.). Harmondsworth: Penguin Books. ISBN 0-300-09675-5.
