= Edward Wadsworth =

English painter

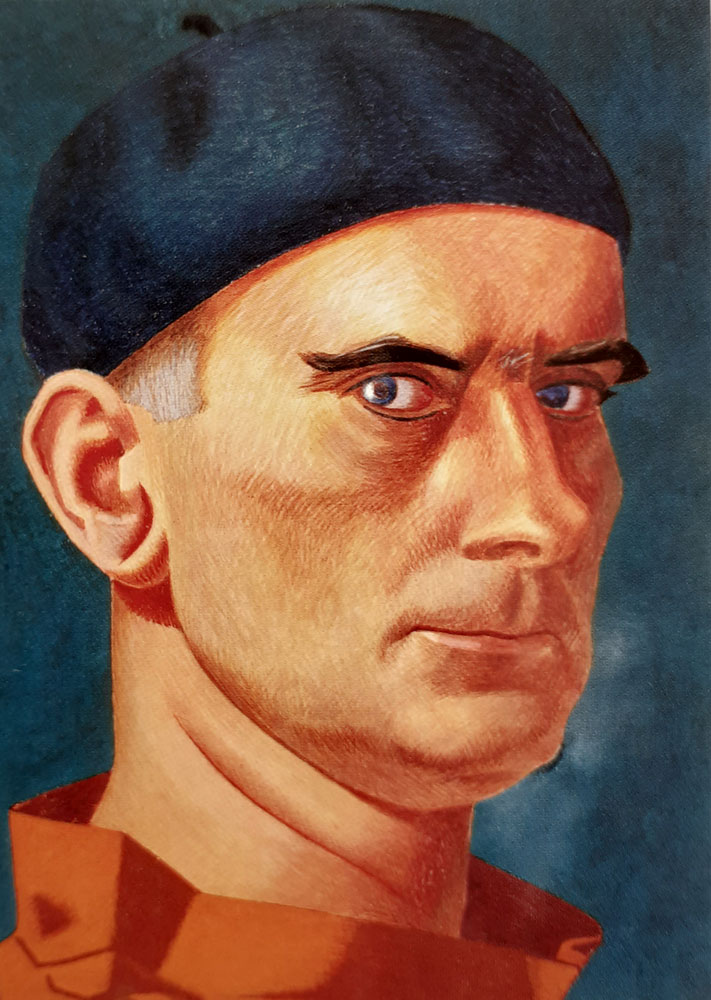
- Wadsworth in 1937 (self-portrait in tempera)
- Born: Edward Alexander Wadsworth; 19 October 1889; Cleckheaton, West Yorkshire
- Died: 21 June 1949 (aged 59); Bayswater, London
- Known for: Painting
- Movement: modernism

Edward Alexander Wadsworth ARA (19 October 1889 – 21 June 1949) was an English artist initially associated with the Vorticism movement. In the First World War he was part of a team involved in the transfer of dazzle camouflage designs to ships for the Royal Navy. After the war his maritime landscapes and still-life compositions using tempera were infused with a surrealistic mood - although he never exhibited with the British surrealists. In the 1930s and the early 1940s his work was mainly abstract. He made a significant contribution to the development of modern art in Britain in the inter-war years.

== Early life and study ==
Edward Wadsworth was born on 19 October 1889 in Cleckheaton, West Yorkshire to Fred and Hannah (née Smith) Wadsworth. His mother died of puerperal sepsis nine days after giving birth. His father was understandably devastated by the loss and found it difficult to relate to the baby. Fred was running the thriving family business – Broomford Mill – that specialised in spinning lustrous wool for weaving braids for uniforms. Edward had a lonely childhood, although his aunt, Annie, was very caring towards him. He became a boarder at Godby's School, Ilkley at the age of 10 and was sent to Fettes College in Edinburgh in 1903. At the time Fettes had a reputation as the 'toughest school in the British Isles' and Edward 'loathed most of his time there'.

Fred Wadsworth had in mind that Edward would one day take over the business and it was probably because Broomford Mill had important clientele in Germany that Edward was sent to study engineering and the German language in Munich between 1906 and 1907. Although Edward did not complete his engineering degree, he did learn German and most significantly he studied art in his spare time at the Knirr School, where he learned woodcut printing and drawing. Munich was a cultural hotbed and Edward was introduced to a lively artistic and intellectual way of life. When he returned home he had decided that he wanted to be an artist –- his father was appalled.

== Art school and beyond ==
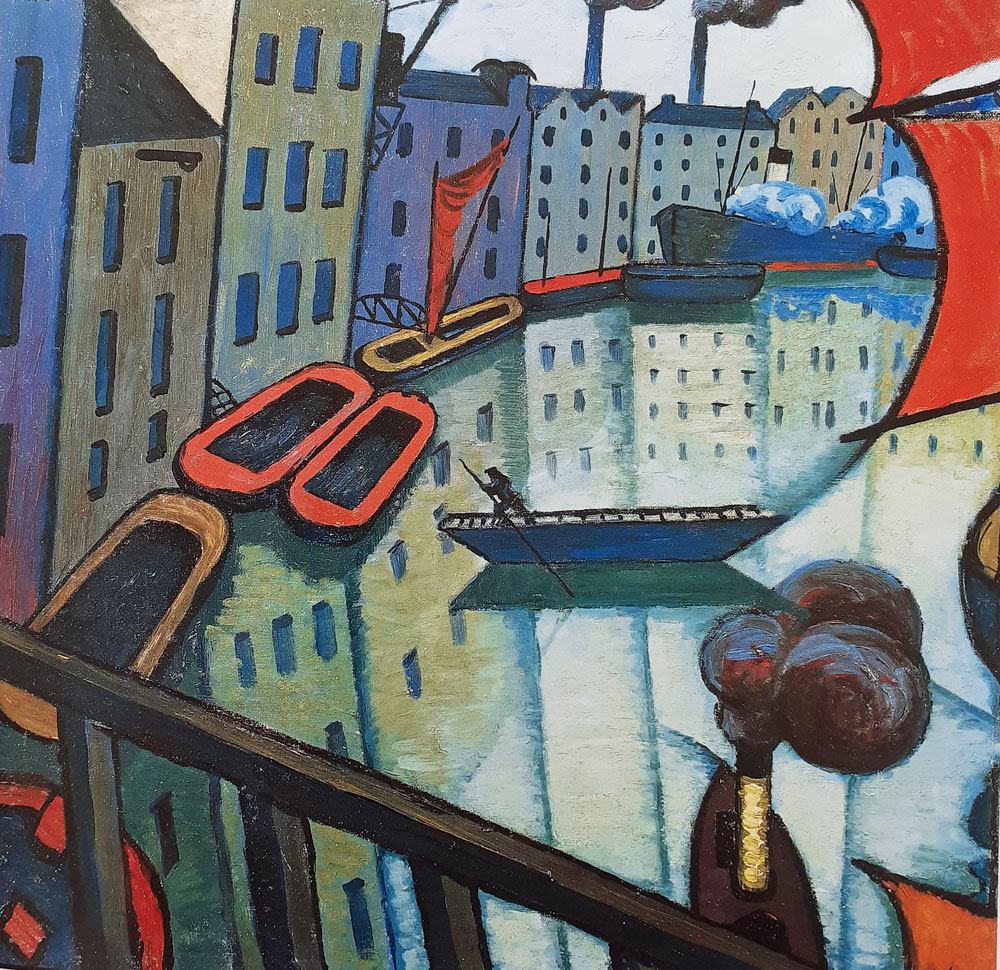
Rotherhithe oil on canvas c.1911

Wadsworth was now the beneficiary of a £250 a year income – probably via a trust fund set up by his aunt Annie – making him financially independent of his father. He attended Bradford School of Art before earning a scholarship to the Slade School of Art, London and spent some time at Le Havre, prior to the start of the autumn term in 1909. His contemporaries at the school included Mark Gertler, Stanley Spencer, CRW Nevinson, William Roberts and Dora Carrington – 'one of the greatest student classes in the history of English art schools'. and his tutors Henry Tonks and Philip Wilson Steer exhibited in an 'impressionist' style with the New English Art Club whilst stressing the discipline of drawing as 'an explanation of form, analysing its construction, preparation and direction [the direction of the bones]' in their teaching. Although the cohort at the Slade was socially diverse, Wadsworth's closest friends - C.R.W. Nevinson and Adrian Allinson were from similarly wealthy backgrounds.

Wadsworth's lecturer in art history at the Slade was Roger Fry who brought the work of European modern artists such as Cezanne, Gauguin and Van Gogh to London in a major exhibition 'Manet and the Post-Impressionists' at the Grafton Galleries towards the end of 1910. Barbara Wadsworth in her biography, A Painter's Life. Edward Wadsworth describes him as slowly developing in style and choice of media whilst at the Slade, yet only really making a real aesthetic leap when he met up with Wyndham Lewis. In 1911 he had met Fanny Mary Eveleigh – a professional violinist and ten years older than Wadsworth – and they married in April 1912, prior to Wadsworth completing his time at the Slade. They set up home in Gloucester Walk off of Kensington Church Street. Wadsworth was starting to exhibit and had a work included in Fry's 'Second Post Impressionist Exhibition' in January 1913. This exhibition brought 'cubist' pictures by Picasso and Braque to London and Wadsworth was included in ' The English Group' that included Bloomsbury artists such as Duncan Grant, Wyndham Lewis, and Stanley Spencer

== Futurism and Vorticism ==
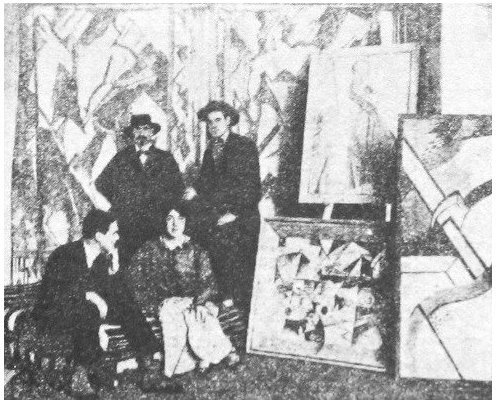
Edward Wadsworth and Wyndham Lewis at the Rebel Art Centre, March 1914, with Kate Lechmere and Cuthbert Hamilton (seated).

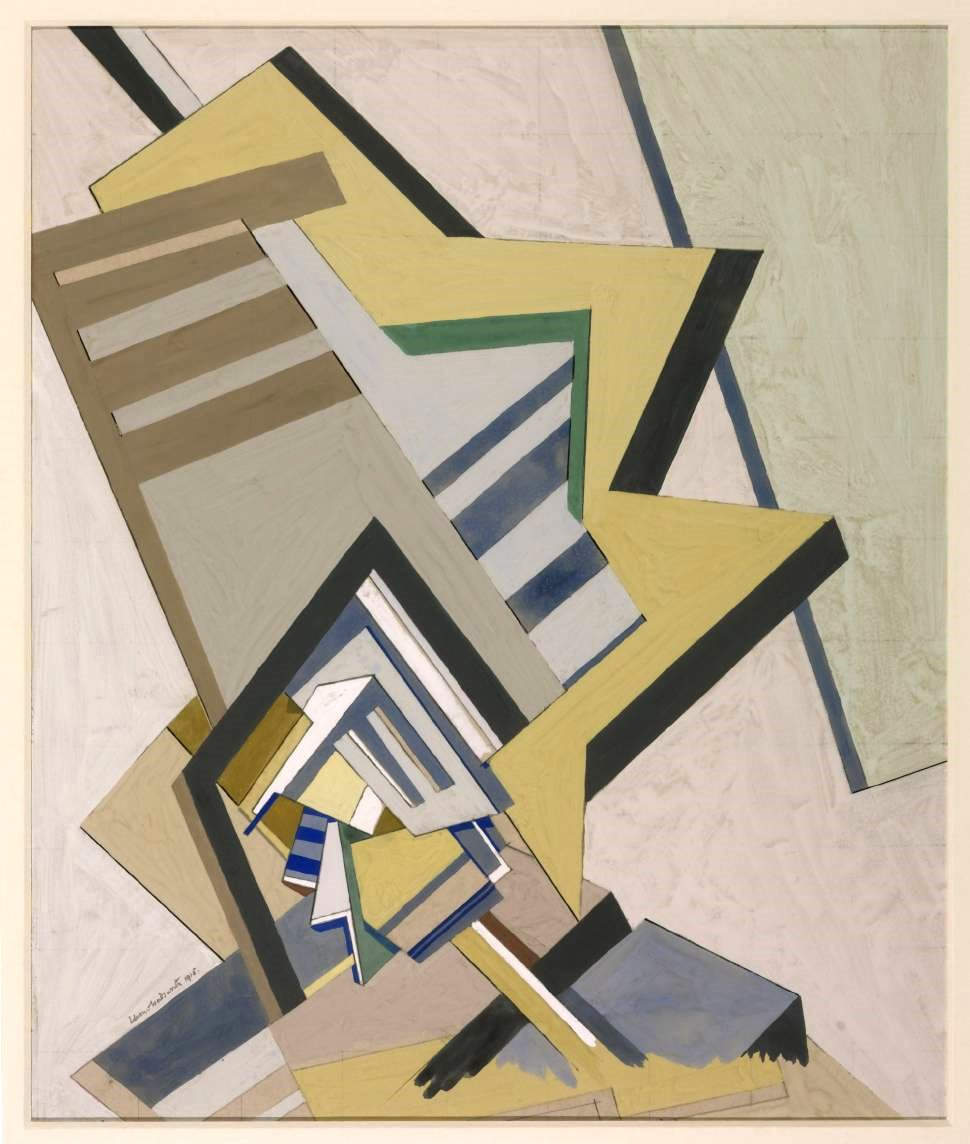
Abstract Composition, 1915 Tate Gallery.

Wadsworth exhibited some futurist-derived paintings at the Futurist Exhibitions at the Doré Gallery. Although a member of the committee that organised a dinner in honour of Filippo Tommaso Marinetti in 1913, he was one of a number of British painters in the nascent avant-garde that became increasingly disenchanted with the Italian's arrogance and jeered Marinetti's public performance of The Battle Of Adrianople. Wadsworth exhibited woodcuts at the Twenty-One Gallery, London in spring 1914 and in that year he also exhibited with the London Group, the Allied Artists' Salon and in the 'Twentieth Century Art' exhibition at the Whitechapel Gallery. He was closely associated with Wyndham Lewis and 'joined' his Rebel Art Group and was a signatory of the Vorticist Manifesto published in BLAST where he contributed illustrations and supplied a review of Kandinsky's Concerning The Spiritual In Art. Wadsworth's vorticist work is now known from his bold, experimental woodcuts as all his oil paintings from 1914-1918 are now lost.

== First World War ==
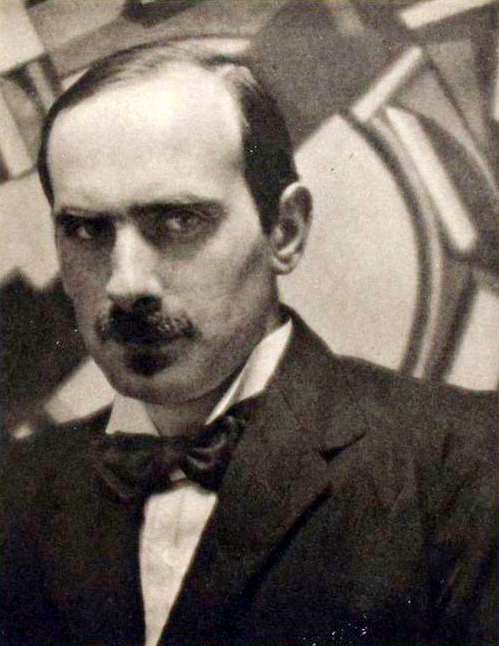
Wadsworth in 1916. Photograph by Alvin Langdon Coburn

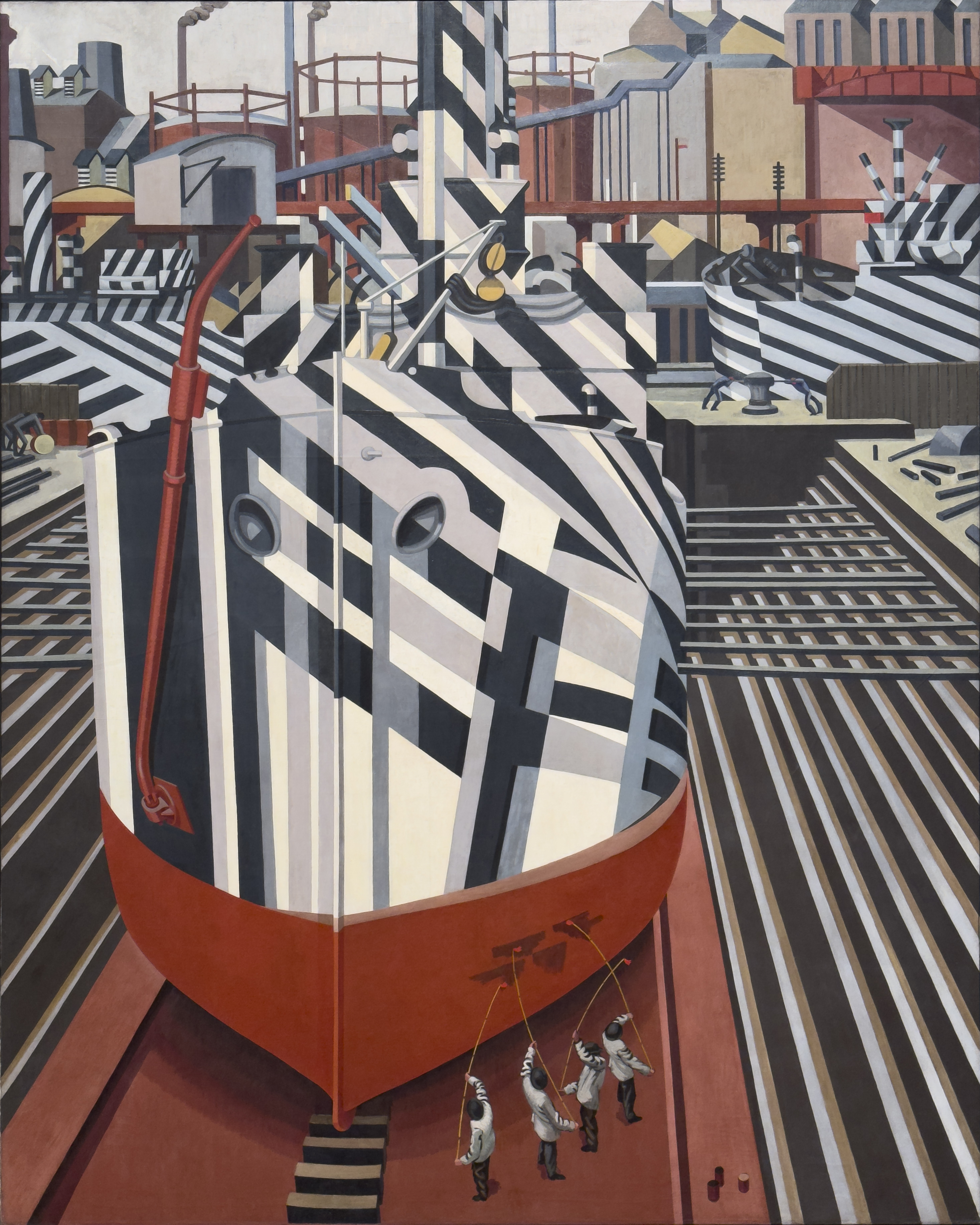
Dazzle-ships in Drydock at Liverpool, 1919, National Gallery of Canada, Ottawa.

Thirty three days after the Vorticist Manifesto was published, war was declared on Germany. Vorticism managed to continue into 1915, with a Vorticist exhibition in June at the Doré Gallery and a second edition of BLAST published to coincide with the show – Wadsworth contributed to both.

In January 1916 the Military Service Act was passed. This imposed conscription on all single men aged between 18 and 41. Wadsworth signed up for the Royal Naval Volunteer Reserve on 10 June 1916 and as a temporary sub-lieutenant he was based at Mudros on the island of Lemnos, Greece.

Through Norman Wilkinson's request he returned to England in 1917 and was demobilised to enable him to become involved in Wilkinson's scheme to transfer dazzle camouflage designs on to Allied ships, based mainly at Liverpool. Known as dazzle ships, the optical effects confused enemy U-boats when trying to identify types of vessels and to pinpoint their direction and speed of travel. Wadsworth produced a number of drawings and woodcuts of camouflaged ships at this time and for towards the end of the war he was commissioned by the Canadian War Memorials Fund (CWMF) to produce Dazzle-Ships in Drydock at Liverpool. This monumental painting (10 feet x 12 feet) was exhibited in London, New York, Toronto and Montreal in 1919 alongside CWMF commissions from Paul Nash, Wyndham Lewis, William Roberts and David Bomberg.

== A return to order ==
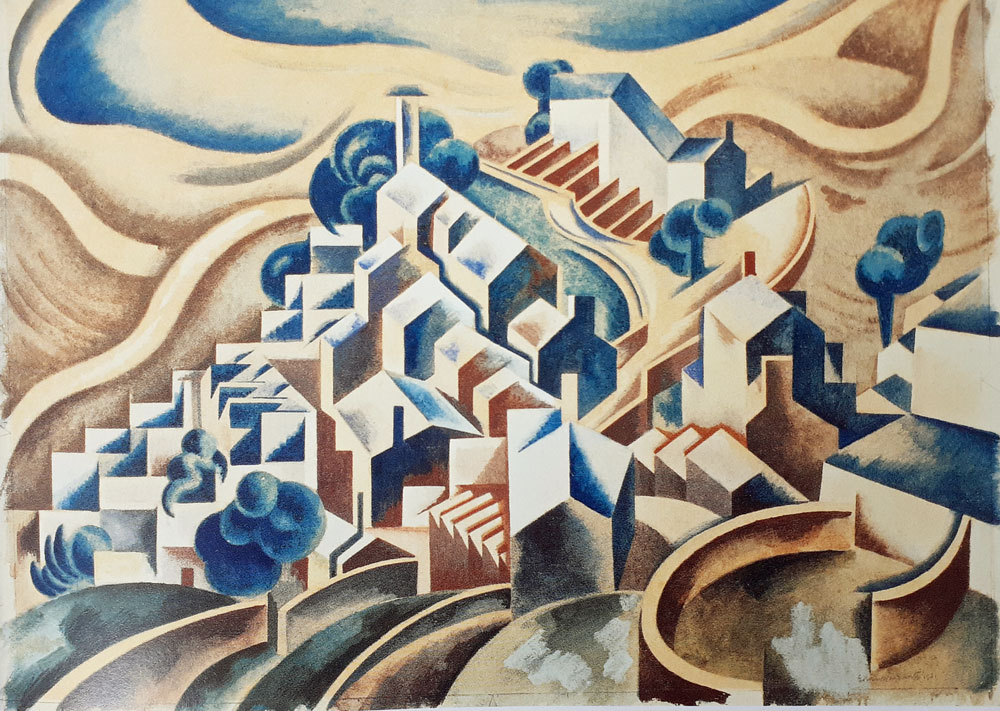
Fortunes Well, Portland watercolour, 1921

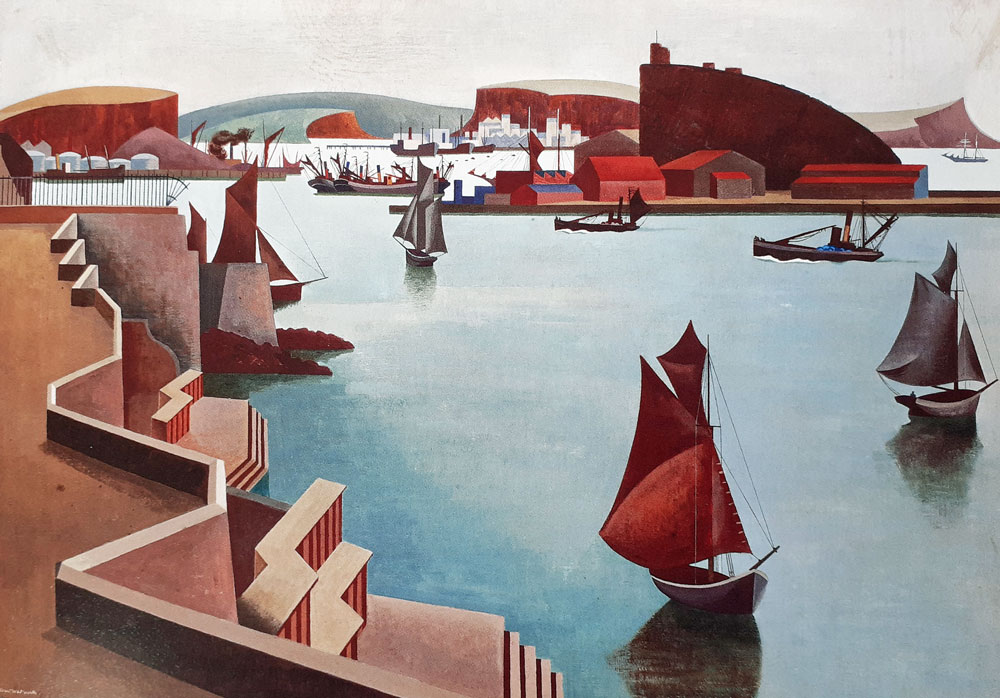
The Cattewater, Plymouth Sound, tempora on board, 1923

Lewis unsuccessfully tried to revive his 'rebel artists' in 1920 with a Group X exhibition. However, the pen and ink drawings of industrial landscapes that Wadsworth exhibited there were developed by him into a one-man show The Black Country that was also linked to a publication. In January 1921 Wadsworth's father died, leaving him almost a quarter of a million pounds. Wadsworth and Fanny holidayed in Newlyn, Cornwall and walked the south coast via Devon and Dorset. He returned to Portland the following year and painted watercolour studies and experimented with tempera – a medium associated with the work of early Renaissance artists. Tempera would be Wadsworth's choice of medium throughout the rest of his life. Wadsworth had two children – Barbara and Anne. Tragically, Anne died of nephritis in March 1922.

A series of landscape pictures depicting strikingly calm coastal towns and ports in Britain and France using tempera was seen as Wadsworth adopting a more 'naturalistic' mode but it is perhaps fairer to say they marked a return to more representational picture making – a position adopted by other avant-garde painters, such as Picasso, Braque and Derain, in the immediate post-war years and referred to as a 'return to order'. Wadsworth's first exhibition of tempera paintings was held at the Leicester Galleries in 1923 – The Times felt they possessed 'an austere and unsentimental beauty'

== 'A leading British modernist' ==
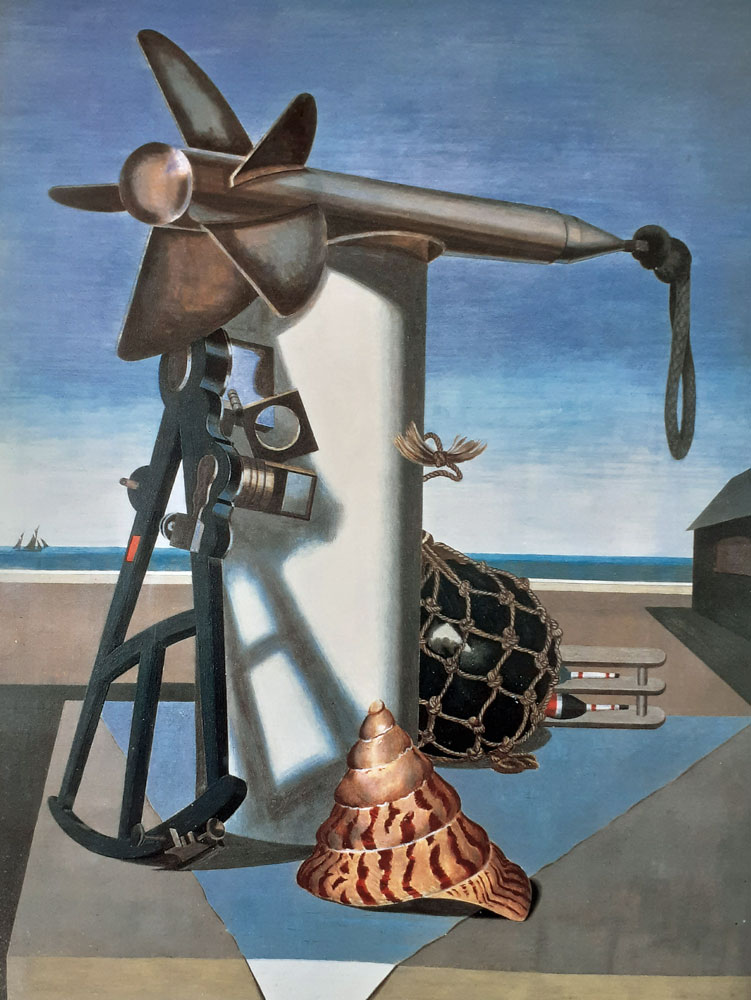
North Sea, 1928

In the second half of the 1920s Wadsworth concentrated on marine-themed still life compositions. Perhaps following ideas articulated by Léger and to some extent exemplified in the work of the German Neue Sachlichkeit painters, Wadsworth juxtaposed modern manufactured objects such as marine navigational equipment with symbols of culture, contrasting the organic – such as sea shells – with the manufactured and using dramatic perspective effects to contrast the small with the vast. His use of tempora created a kind of realism that seemed ultramodern whilst also harking back to the past.

By the end of the 1920s Wadsworth was successfully exhibiting in Paris and London. His work was reproduced in European avant-garde arts magazines and he could be seen as 'a leading British modernist artist'.

== Spirit of the Thirties ==
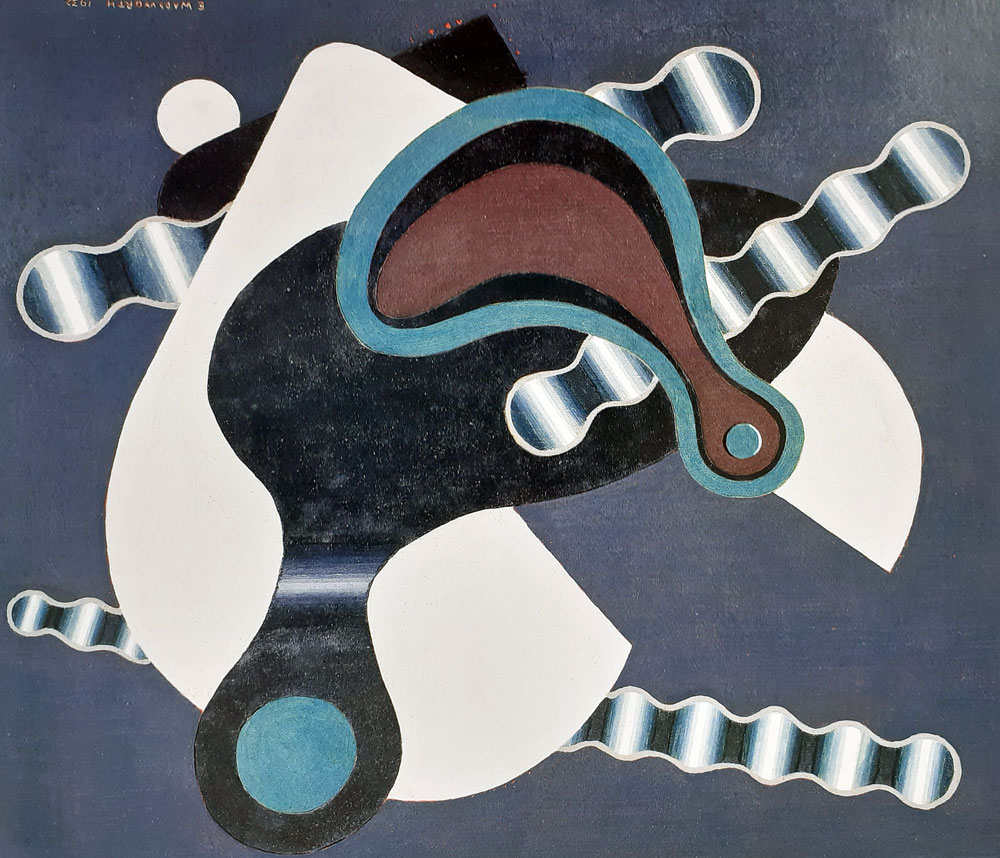
Composition, Crank and Chain, 1932

In 1927 the family moved to 'Dairy House' in Maresfield, East Sussex. After substantial modernisation of the house and gardens, Edward and Fanny Wadsworth hosted regular weekend gatherings, picnics and garden parties throughout the next decade. Guests included avant-garde artists such as Paul Nash, Max Ernst, Pierre Roy, Laszlo Moholy-Nagy, Roland Penrose, Lee Miller and Henry Moore alongside art critics, actors, musicians, opera singers and dancers.

Wadsworth was a founder member of two radical pro-abstract movements in the early 1930s. Paul Nash's Unit One was ‘an expression of a truly contemporary spirit’ and Wadsworth exhibited with them at the Mayor Gallery, London alongside Nash, Moore, Barbara Hepworth, Ben Nicholson and Edward Burra. He also exhibited with the Abstraction-Création group in Paris. Wadsworth outlined his approach to 'abstract art' in an insightful article published in The Studio magazine in 1933.

The mid-1930s saw two commissions that placed Wadsworth at the forefront of art deco design – the tea room of the De La Warr Pavilion at Bexhill-on-Sea and two huge paintings for the Cunard Line's RMS Queen Mary. However, Wadsworth felt that the outcome of the Cunard Line commission had been compromised by the requirements for recognisable nautical subjects.

== Later life ==
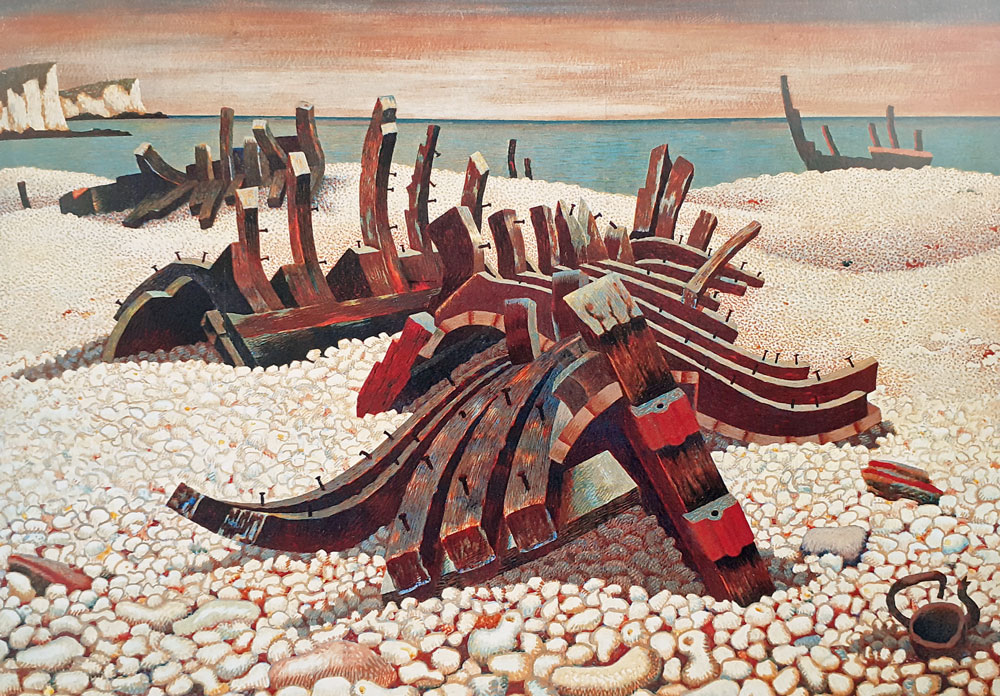
Requiescat, 1940

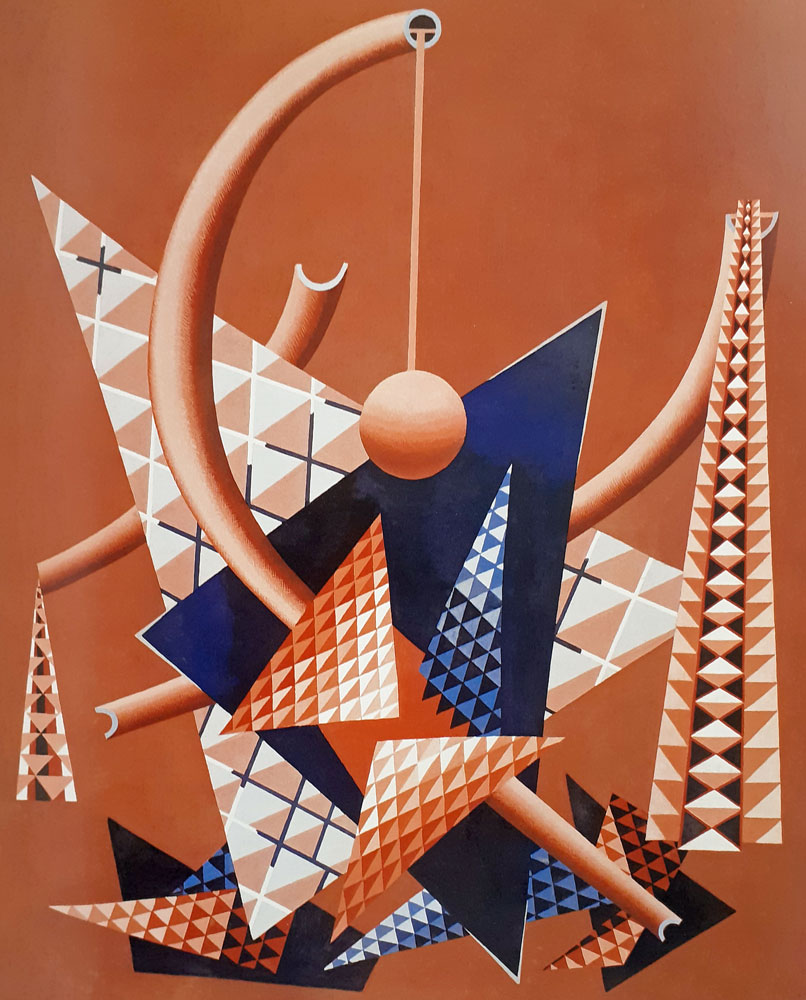
Triangles, 1948

As the Second World War started Wadsworth was disappointed not to be appointed as a war artist by the War Artists' Advisory Committee and he and his wife, daughter and her two sons had to leave Dairy House as it was in an area cleared of civilians by the army. The Wadsworths moved to Buxton in Derbyshire, where they stayed for five years. Concern about the war and Wadsworth's own circumstances seem to inform the melancholic mood created in the debris-strewn beach of Requiescat. For the first time Wadsworth's finances were under pressure and this may have contributed to his decision to start exhibiting at the Royal Academy summer show. In April 1943 he was elected an Associate of the Royal Academy (ARA). Wadsworth had joined the Buxton Home Guard and after training he was promoted to sergeant. The family moved back to Maresfield in 1945 and Wadsworth painted a series of abstract images that incorporated flower imagery. Although very different to his Vorticist abstracts of 1914, his last paintings, such as Triangles in 1948, did represent a return to, or development of, pure abstract forms.

A leaking appendix had been misdiagnosed in 1940 and in June 1949 Wadsworth died from peritonitis after an operation.

== Legacy ==
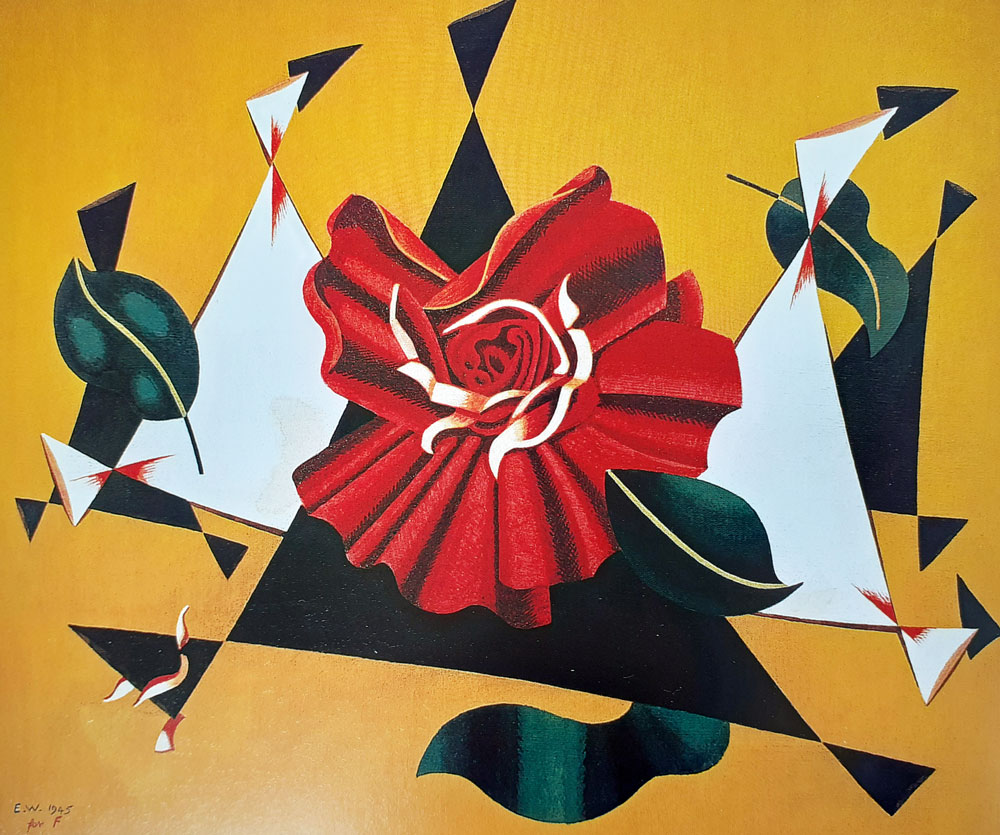
Abstract with Rose, for F 1945

The Tate Gallery staged a memorial exhibition in 1951. Wadsworth's daughter, Barbara Wadsworth, wrote a biography A Painter's Life, Edward Wadsworth in 1989 that draws upon the family archive and in the same year Bradford Art Galleries held a major retrospective A Genius of Industrial England. Edward Wadsworth 1889-1949 accompanied by a publication edited by Jeremy Lewison. In 2005 Jonathan Black published Form, Feeling and Calculation which includes the complete paintings and drawings of Wadsworth. This book was initiated by his grandsons Derek von Bethmann-Hollweg and Alexander Hollweg, who also became a painter and sculptor and whose life and work was celebrated in a major retrospective exhibition at The Museum of Somerset (November 2023-March 2024). Alexander’s work shows some of his stylistic and subject matter influences.

The dazzle ships project of the First World War continues to inspire. The graphic designer Peter Saville had seen Wadsworth's painting Dazzle-ships in Drydock at Liverpool and was struck by the image. After suggesting the idea and title to Andy McCluskey of Orchestral Manoeuvres in the Dark, Saville carried the theme over to the sleeve design of their album Dazzle Ships (1983). More recently Dazzle ship (14–18 NOW) is a contemporary art commission by the Imperial War Museum to commemorate the centenary of the outbreak of World War I in August 2014 and includes work by Peter Blake.
