= The Vorticists at the Restaurant de la Tour Eiffel, Spring 1915 =

Painting by William Roberts

- Artist: William Roberts
- Year: 1961–1962
- Medium: Oil on canvas
- Dimensions: 183 cm × 213.5 cm (72 in × 84.1 in)
- Location: Tate; London

The Vorticists at the Restaurant de la Tour Eiffel, Spring 1915 is a 1961–1962 painting by the English artist William Roberts. It depicts the Vorticist group gathered at a French restaurant in London.

== Description ==
The painting shows a crowded table inside the restaurant of the Hôtel de la Tour Eiffel at 1 Percy Street, London. Around the table are the key members of Vorticism, a British abstract art movement that flourished briefly in the 1910s. The six seated men are, from left to right: Cuthbert Hamilton, Ezra Pound, William Roberts, Wyndham Lewis, Frederick Etchells and Edward Wadsworth. Etchells holds a copy of the first issue of the Vorticist magazine Blast. In the doorway to the left are the movement's two female members, Jessica Dismorr and Helen Saunders. Standing to the right are the waiter Joe and the restaurant's proprietor, Rudolph Stulik.

== Creation ==
The Tour Eiffel restaurant had been visited frequently by the Poets' Club of T. E. Hulme, including F. S. Flint and Ezra Pound, and thus had been a centre for Imagism. It became a favourite location for the literary circles around Augustus John, Wyndham Lewis and Nancy Cunard, which through Lewis included the Vorticists. As Richard Cork has noted, however, Robert's picture is "an imaginative evocation rather than an historically accurate record" of the launching of Blast, which actually took place with a meal at the Dieudonné Restaurant in St James's in July 1914.

In a 1957 piece for The Listener, Roberts reminisced about the relationship between Vorticism and the restaurant:

In my memory la cuisine Française and Vorticism are indissolubly linked. Both Signor Rossi of the Etoile, and M. Rudolph Stulik of the Tour Eiffel should rank in the records of Vorticism as honorary members of the 'Group'. Lewis who liked good food, and fine wine to go with it, kept a ringed serviette in each of these restaurants. If, as he claimed, Vorticism was the expression of a new philosophy, then it must be the newness of Rabelais, and of old Omar Khayyam's 'A jug of wine, a loaf of bread and thou beside me singing'. Nor was it developed in the gloom of a studio, but at the Tour Eiffel over a tourne-dos and a bottle of Burgundy.

The first and only exhibition of the Vorticist group was held in June 1915 at the Doré Gallery in London. In addition to the artists present in Roberts' painting, the exhibition featured Henri Gaudier-Brzeska, Bernard Adeney, Lawrence Atkinson, David Bomberg, Duncan Grant, Jacob Kramer and C. R. W. Nevinson.

== Provenance ==
The painting was purchased from the artist by Tate in 1962 through the Chantrey Bequest.
