= Percy Street =

Street in London

Coordinates: 51°31′5.68″N 0°8′1.08″W

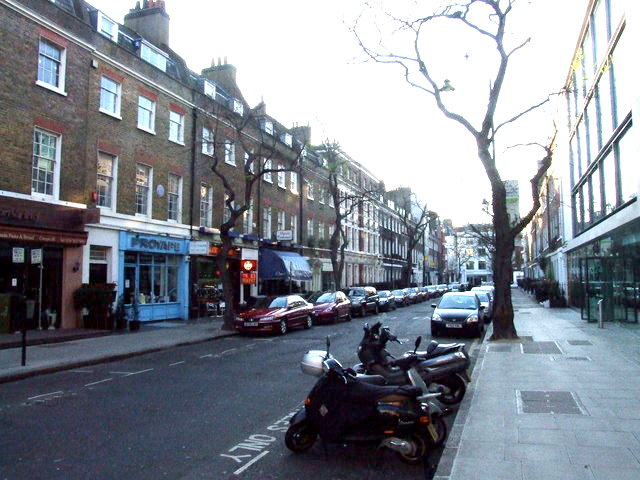
Percy Street

Percy Street is a street in the London Borough of Camden that runs from Rathbone Street in the west to Tottenham Court Road in the east. At its western end it is joined by Rathbone Place and Charlotte Street. Nearby Percy Mews is off Rathbone Place. The street was built in the 1760s and is known for the number of artists that have lived there.

== History ==
The land on which Percy Street is built was owned by Francis and William Goodge. They granted leases on the south side in 1764 and the north side in 1766. Twenty-eight houses had been completed by 1770.

== Buildings ==
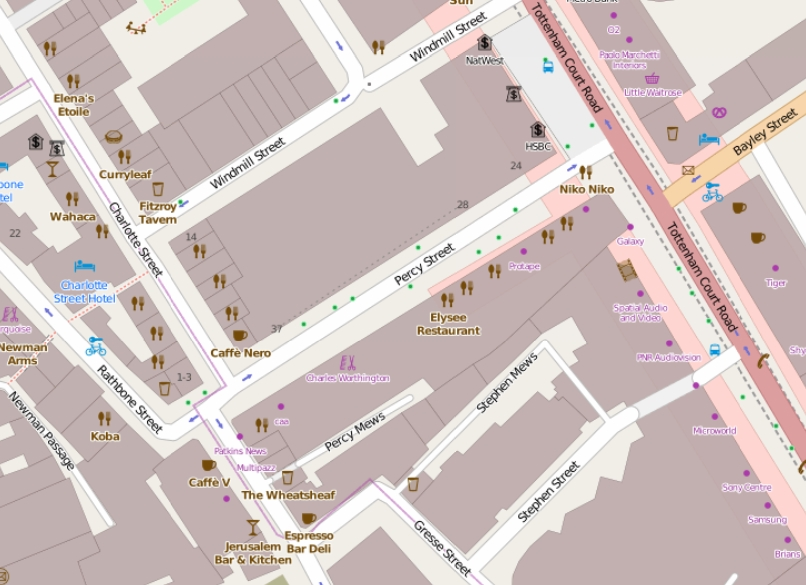
The immediate vicinity of Percy Street

The architecture of Percy Street is undistinguished. Most of the buildings are generic three-storey Georgian town houses with standard interior features. The ground floors of around half the houses on the street have been converted to retail use, and on the north side a large modern office block is situated on the corner of Tottenham Court Road. Number 21 was destroyed by bombing during the Second World War. Some of the houses have been resurfaced in concrete and had extra storeys added.

Number 1 Percy Street was the site of the White Tower restaurant, formerly the Eiffel Tower hotel and restaurant. The restaurant was taken over by Rudolf Stulik, the former chef to Lord Kitchener, in 1910 and became very popular with painters of the Vorticist movement in 1914 and was frequented by Augustus John in the 1930s. John took the young lady who became Dylan Thomas's wife to one of the Eiffel Tower Hotel rooms on an assignation before her marriage. Among its patrons were Archduke Rudolph, Madame Kharsavina, Lord Birkenhead, Chaliapin, the Duke of Gloucester, and George Bernard Shaw, as well as the Prince of Wales, later King Edward VIII. It was memorialised in William Roberts' painting The Vorticists at the Restaurant de la Tour Eiffel, Spring 1915 (completed 1961–2). It became the White Tower in 1943. Since then it became Bam-Bou, an Asian restaurant. Today it is the House of Ho, a fine dining modern Vietnamese restaurant with a sister site in Soho. In 1922 the street was home to the New Court Club where Freda Kempton met the Chinese drug dealer Brilliant Chang, a meeting which may have led to her death.

== Inhabitants ==
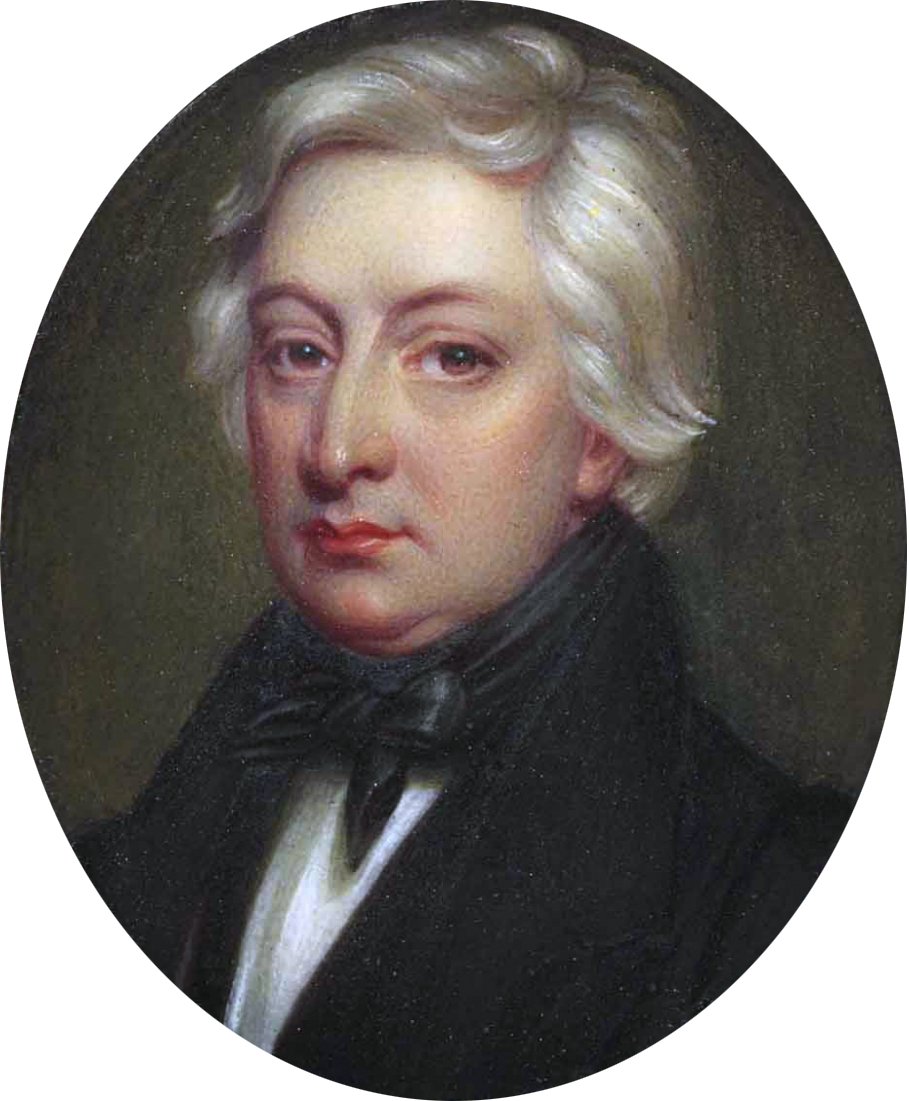
Royal enameller Henry Pierce Bone, seen here in an 1867 self-portrait, once lived in Percy Street.

Among the people who have lived in Percy Street have been:

- Artist Barbara Bagenal lived at No. 18 on the floor below Sonia Orwell between 1951 and 1964, and frequently shared her accommodation with her partner Clive Bell.
- Sculptor Edward Hodges Baily lived in No. 8 between 1825 and 1828, and at No. 10 from 1830 to 1846.
- Henry Pierce Bone, enamel painter to George II, George IV and William IV, lived at No. 12 between 1832 and 1846, and later at number 22.
- Samuel Cotes (1734–1818), miniature painter, lived at No. 8 between 1794 and 1798.
- Illustrator and watercolourist Godefroy Durand lived at No. 8 in 1881.
- Music hire library and publisher Goodwin & Tabb was located at No. 34 Percy Street from 1906 until the mid-1920s.
- Actor Charles Laughton lived at No. 15 in 1928–31, and a blue plaque notes the fact.
- Painter and author Wyndham Lewis lived at No. 4 in 1914 and at No. 31 in the 1930s.
- Sonia Orwell (1918–1980), literary editor and wife of George Orwell lived at No. 18 from 1949 to the late 1950s.
- The Pre-Raphaelite and Catholic poet Coventry Patmore lived at No. 14. which has a blue plaque.
- Painter William Roberts lived at No. 32 in 1918–19.
- Jacob George Strutt, engraver and painter, lived at No. 34 from 1821 until 1826.
- Saxon Sydney-Turner, Treasury mandarin and associate of the Bloomsbury Group lived in a top-floor at No. 28 from 1943 to 1955, and then sub-let it to Vanessa Bell and Duncan Grant, who redecorated it and lived there intermittently until 1961.
- Henry Tidey, watercolourist, lived at No. 30 where he died in 1872.
- Landscape painter Peter de Wint lived at No. 10 from 1817 until 1826.
