= Tidey =

Tidey is a surname. Notable people with the surname include:

- Alec Tidey (born 1955), Canadian ice hockey player
- Alfred Tidey (1808–1892), English miniature-painter
- H. Gordon Tidey (1879–1971), English railway photographer
- Henry Tidey (1814–1872), British watercolorist
- Saskia Tidey (born 1993), Irish sailor
