= Catherine Dawson Giles =

British painter (1878–1955)

- Born: 31 July 1878; Lewisham, London, England
- Died: 1955 (aged 76–77)
- Education: Goldsmiths, University of London; Royal Academy Schools
- Style: Watercolour
- Movement: Modernism

Catherine Dawson Giles (1878–1955) was a British modernist watercolour painter.

== Biography ==
Catherine Dawson Giles was born on 31 July 1878 in Lewisham, south-east London. She attended Goldsmiths, University of London in New Cross in 1900 and later the Royal Academy Schools. She studied with the American painter Max Bohm in Etaples, France, as part of the Etaples art colony. In 1904 she met the English painter and illustrator Jessica Dismorr, a fellow student at Etaples, with whom she became lifelong friends. Dismorr, a member of the Vorticist movement, shared her home in the 1930s and painted her portrait.

During World War I Giles served as a Voluntary Aid Detachment nurse. She traveled throughout Europe and Northern Africa during the 1920s and 30's on painting trips and also painted many scenes of Etaples. Giles exhibited with the New English Art Club in the 1920s and had a one-woman show of watercolours and gouaches at the Claridge Galleries. A Roman Catholic, Giles joined the Guild of Catholic Artists in 1929 and participated in their exhibitions alongside Glyn Philpot and Eric Gill in the 1930s.

The art of Dismorr and Giles was shown in a joint exhibition at the Fine Art Society, London, in 2000. Notable works by Giles include Village roofs, South of France a pencil and watercolour from 1930.
