= Ethel Kibblewhite =

British salonnière

Ethel Kibblewhite, c. 1910s.

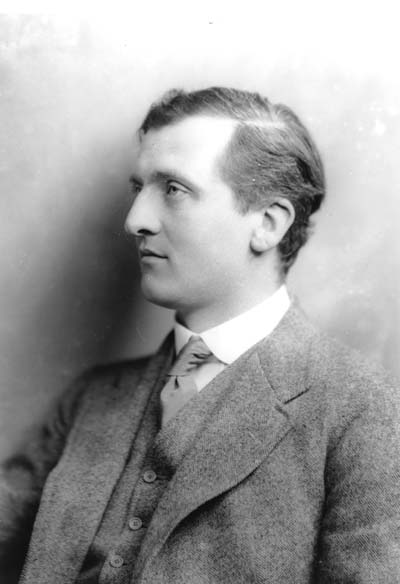
T.E. Hulme in 1912.

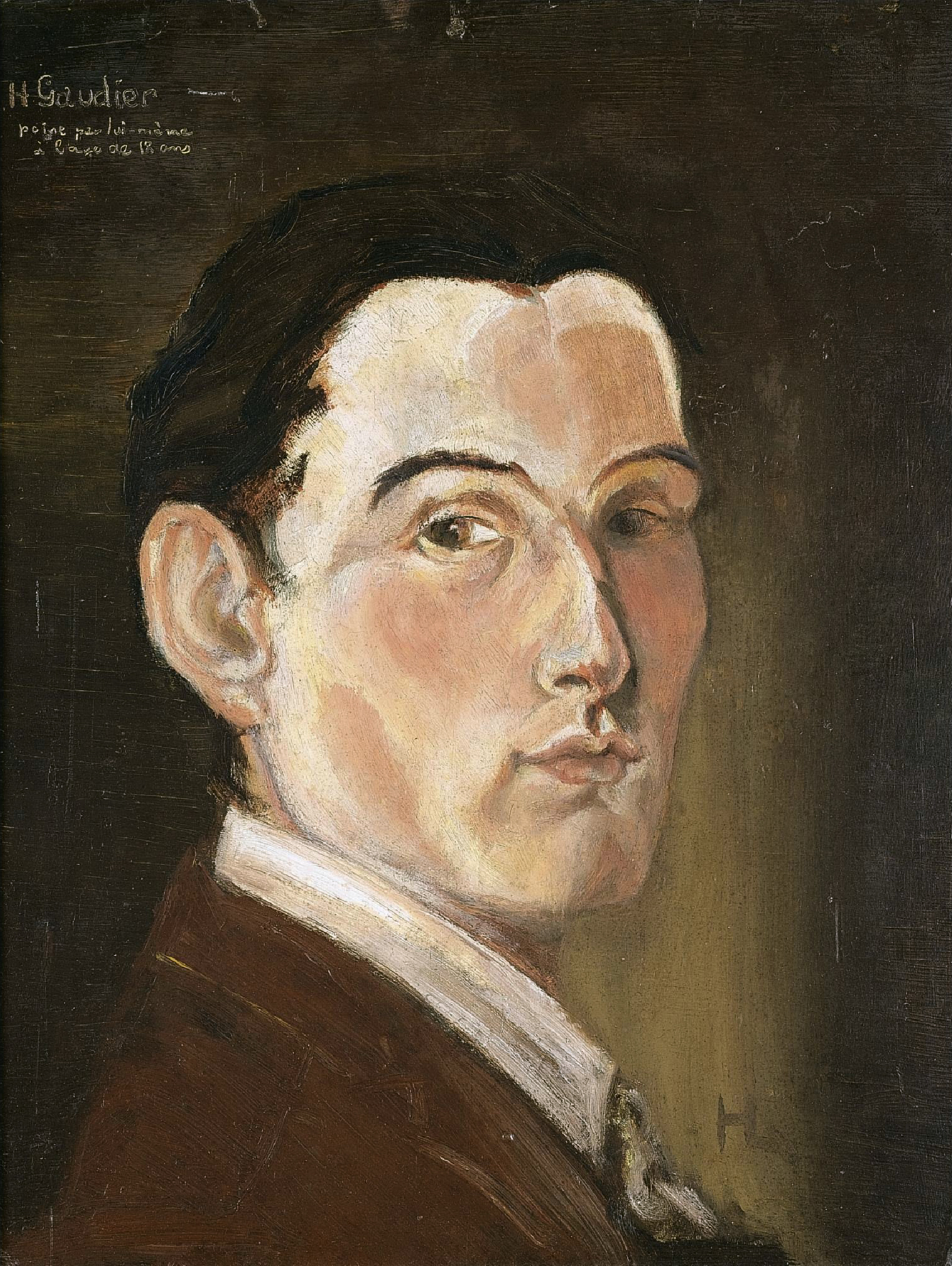
Henri Gaudier-Brzeska self-portrait, 1909.

Ethel (Dolly) Kibblewhite (1873–1947) was the host of an important artistic and literary salon in London in the 1910s. The salon was held at her home at 67 Frith Street and presided over by the poet and critic T.E. Hulme.

== Early life ==
Born to Ethel Curtis, Kibblewhite was the oldest daughter of Thomas Figgis Curtis, a stained glass maker, and his wife Mary. Her sister, Dora Curtis, was also an artist. The two sisters studied drawing under Fred Brown, latterly at the Slade School of Art.

== Marriage ==
Ethel married Gilbert Kibblewhite in London in 1900. They moved to Storrington in West Sussex where Gilbert became the manager of a dairy farm which his father had bought for him. The marriage was unsuccessful as Gilbert was unable to control his temper, causing Ethel to several times flee from him with their children Peter and Diana (later the lutanist Diana Poulton). On one occasion when they were separated, Gilbert arrived at his father in law's house at Rustington where Ethel had sought refuge from him and demanded to see her. Being denied, Gilbert burned down one of his father in law's outhouses along with the eight beehives stored inside. The marriage was effectively over by 1903 and Gilbert soon after left for Australia at the behest of his family. He returned during World War One with an Australian army regiment and he and Ethel met to discuss a divorce.

== Frith Street ==
After the separation, Ethel Kibblewhite worked at the Royal School of Needlework. She lived at her father's house at 67 Frith Street, a Queen Anne house on the corner of Soho Square in London that had once been the Venetian embassy. Her father ran his business, Ward & Hughes, Ecclesiastical Stained Glass Manufacturers, from one floor of the house, the rest was family accommodation. Arnold Dolmetsch was a visitor to the house.

From 1911, T.E. Hulme had a study of his own in the house. He and Kibblewhite became lovers and they spent the summers together at Rustington with the children but Hulme never lived at Frith Street and he never stopped chasing other women. From 1914, Hulme was in a relationship with the painter Kate Lechmere and latterly they regarded themselves as engaged as Hulme could not countenance marrying a divorcee (Kibblewhite was separated but not yet divorced) but Hulme was killed in action in 1917 before he could marry Lechmere. Hulme was careful not to let Kibblewhite know about Lechmere, though she was aware of Kibblewhite.

== The Salon ==
The salon at Frith Street, presided over by T.E. Hulme, was attended by many of the important literary and artistic figures before the First World War. These included C.R.W. Nevinson, Jacob Epstein, J.C. Squire, Henri Gaudier-Brzeska, Rupert Brooke and others. From Gaudier-Brzeska, Kibblewhite acquired the small bronze Fish sculpture, now in the Tate Gallery. Gaudier-Brzeska asked Kibblewhite to keep the item in her handbag. He made a number of similar small items for friends including knuckledusters for T.E. Hulme. Kibblewhite was at Charing Cross Station when his friends said goodbye to Gaudier-Brzeska before he left for France where he was killed in action.

The salon was the scene of the fight between Wyndham Lewis and T.E. Hulme in 1914 after Lewis became convinced that Hulme was a rival for the affections of Kate Lechmere (he was) and control of the Rebel Art Centre (he wasn't). After a quarrel between Lewis and Lechmere, Lewis pronounced his intention to kill Hulme and Lechmere was forced to follow Lewis through the streets of London begging him "Please don't kill him, please don't". When Lewis eventually found Hulme at Frith Street, he burst into the room with the words "What are you doing to me?" A fight ensued and Lewis managed to get Hulme by the throat but Hulme, who was the more powerful man, got the better of Lewis and after the struggle went outside, hung him upside down on the railings of nearby Soho Square.

== Art forgeries ==
In 1930, Kibblewhite was a witness in a case brought by Jacob Epstein against a London gallery which he alleged had been selling works which they attributed to him but which he had not made.

== Later life ==
Kibblewhite never married again and spent her later life quietly in West Sussex. She died in 1947.
