= Jacob Kramer =

Ukrainian–British painter and graphic artist (1892–1962)

- Джейкоб Крамер
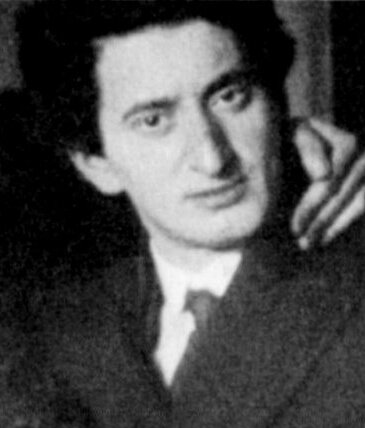
- Kramer during the 1920s
- Born: 26 December 1892; Klyntsi, Chernigov Governorate, Russian Empire (now Russia)
- Died: 4 February 1962 (aged 69); Jewish Home of Rest, Balham, London, UK
- Resting place: Jewish cemetery, Gelderd Road, Leeds
- Citizenship: UK (from 1922)
- Education: Manchester School of Art; Leeds School of Art, 1911; Slade School of Fine Art, 1914
- Occupations: Painter; graphic designer
- Relatives: William Roberts (brother-in-law)

Jacob Kramer (Ukrainian: Джейкоб Крамер; 26 December 1892 – 4 February 1962) was a Russian-born Ukrainian–British painter and graphic designer based in Leeds.

== Early life and education ==
Jacob Kramer was born on 26 December 1892 in Klyntsi, Chernigov Governorate, (present-day Klintsy, Russia) to a middle-class Ukrainian–Jewish family. His father, Max Kramer (né Meir Kramer; 1863–1916 (Note: Also cited as 1915.)), was a court painter to Horace Günzburg, and his mother, Cecilia (Note: Also cited as Celia.) Kramer (1869–1947), was an opera singer and performer of Slavic and Hebrew folk songs. The eldest of five siblings, Kramer was the brother-in-law of the artist William Roberts through his sister Sarah Roberts (née Kramer; 1900–1992).

In 1900, the Kramer family migrated to Leeds where there was an established Jewish community. Attending the Darley Street council school, the family lived for a short time in the Leylands before moving to Chapeltown. In 1902, aged ten, Kramer ran away to Liverpool where he went to sea for six months before later working odd jobs across the Northern England and Manchester. During this period Kramer attended evening classes at the Manchester School of Art.

Returning to Leeds, Kramer began studying at the Leeds School of Art (present-day Leeds Arts University) in 1907. The following year Kramer won a scholarship to study at the Leeds School of Art for three years. During this time Kramer become involved in the radical modernist organisation the Leeds Arts Club, which introduced him to the ideas of expressionist artists, such as Wassily Kandinsky and the spiritual beliefs that came to underpin his work.

With a scholarship from the Jewish Educational Aid Society, Kramer was able to study at the Slade School of Art from 1913 to 1914. Here be befriended other leading artists of the day, including Augustus John, David Bomberg and William Roberts, and he was involved in the Vorticist movement led by Roberts and Wyndham Lewis, although was never really a follower of the style. Nonetheless, several of his woodcuts did appear in the Vorticist literary magazine BLAST, and other periodicals including Colour, Rhythm and Art and Letters.

== Career ==
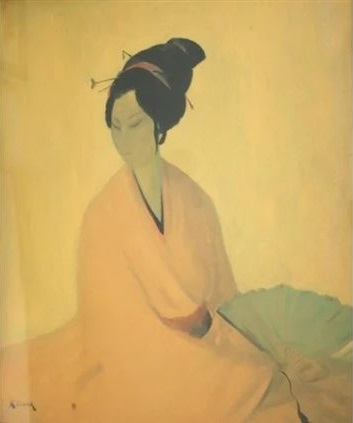
Kramer (1919) A Study of a Japanese Girl

In London, Kramer rapidly became well known in the hedonistic artistic circles that dominated before the First World War and was to be seen frequently at well-known artistic haunts, including the cabaret-club The Cave of the Golden Calf, The Cafe Royal and The Tour Eiffel. His first one-man show was in Bradford, and he had several exhibitions in London, as well as Glasgow and Leeds. He also gained a reputation as a portrait artist in addition to his more avant-garde work.

Kramer was called up for military service in 1917, serving for two years including in France during the March 1918 campaign. Writing to his close friend and fellow Arts Club member Herbert Read in 1918, Kramer stated that when he looked at an object he saw both its physical appearance and its spiritual manifestation. His struggle, he claimed, was to escape the physical appearance and only paint the spiritual form. Such ideas came straight from the expressionist and Theosophical spiritualism that dominated the Leeds Arts Club, and show clearly that Kramer was himself an English Expressionist artist. Kramer later returned to Leeds and became a member of the cities Bohemian sub-culture. He was naturalised on 16 January 1922.

After the collapse of the Leeds Arts Club in 1923 he had numerous schemes to establish a new artistic meeting place in the city, almost all of which came to nothing. The great exception to this was the informal gathering called the Yorkshire Luncheon Club, which met regularly at Whitelock's Ale House in Leeds, and invited some of the leading cultural figures of the 1930s, 40s and 50s to Leeds to speak.

He became an established artist, and also taught at the Leeds School of Art. As a portrait painter, his sitters included Mahatma Gandhi and Frederick Delius

Kramer was commissioned to illustrate portions of the Soncino edition of the Bible and Prophets

== Personal life ==
Bust of Jacob Kramer by Jacob Epstein

On 4 February 1962, Kramer died at the Jewish Home of Rest in Balham aged 69. At the time of his death, Kramer was known to have Parkinson's disease and chronic bronchitis. On 7 February, Kramer was buried at the Jewish cemetery in Gelderd Road, Leeds.

A memorial service for Kramer was held at Leeds City Art Gallery.

== Legacy ==
In 1968, the Leeds School of Art was renamed Jacob Kramer College but was later renamed the Leeds College of Art and Design in 1993.

His friend Jacob Epstein made a bust of him, copies of which can be found in the Tate in London and at Leeds City Art Gallery. The Tate, the Victoria & Albert Museum and the British Museum all hold examples of Kramer's work, but the most extensive collections can be found in Leeds at the Leeds City Art Gallery and Leeds University Art Gallery.

A small selection of personal material belonging to Jacob Kramer was donated to Leeds Central Library by his sister and nephew. The collection contains exhibition catalogues (including one signed by such well-known figures as Herbert Read); books belonging to Jacob; and a selection of photographs, including many of the wider Kramer family.
