= Jessica Dismorr =

English painter and illustrator (1885–1939)

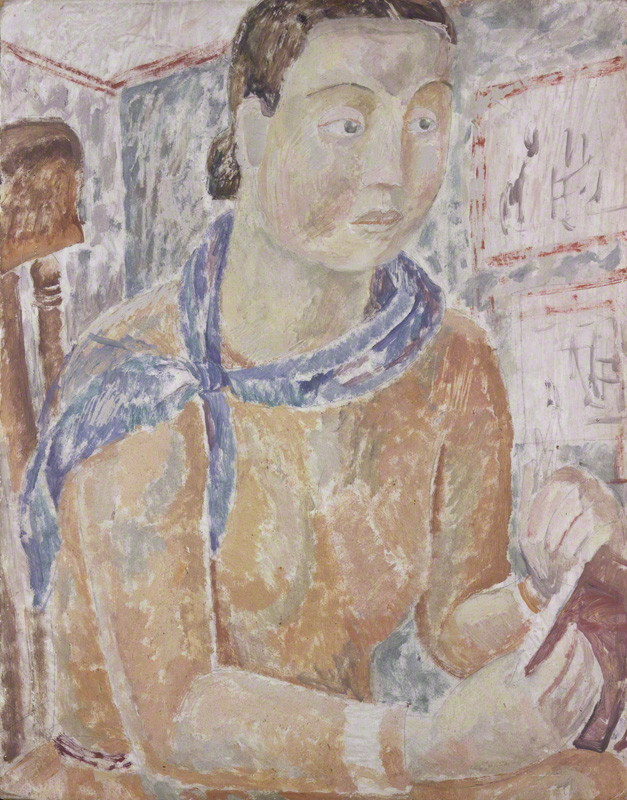
- Jessica Dismorr, self-portrait, 1929
- Born: 3 March 1885; Gravesend, Kent, England
- Died: 29 August 1939 (aged 54); London, England
- Education: Slade School of Fine Art
- Known for: Abstract painting

Jessica Stewart Dismorr (3 March 1885 – 29 August 1939) was an English painter and illustrator. Dismorr participated in almost all of the avant-garde groups active in London between 1912 and 1937 and was one of the few English painters of the 1930s to work in a completely abstract manner. She was one of only two women members of the Vorticist movement and also exhibited with the Allied Artists Association, the Seven and Five Society and the London Group. She was the only female contributor to Group X and displayed abstract works at the 1937 Artists' International Association exhibition. Poems and illustrations by Dismorr appeared in several avant-garde publications including Blast, Rhythm and an edition of Axis.

== Early life ==
Dismorr was born at Gravesend in Kent, the fourth of five daughters born to Mary Ann Dismorr, née Clowes, and John Stewart Dismorr, a rich businessman with property interests in South Africa, Canada and Australia. The family moved to Hampstead in the 1890s, where Jessica Dismorr was educated at Kingsley College and where she became head girl. Her mother suffered from extended periods of ill health but her father's income meant the family were free of financial worries and Jessica was able to travel extensively in Europe.

Dismorr attended the Slade School of Art from 1902 to 1903, before training under Max Bohm at Etaples in 1904, and at the Académie de La Palette in Paris, between 1910 and 1913, where she studied under Jean Metzinger and was in the circle around the Scottish Colourist, John Duncan Fergusson. In Paris, Dismorr shared a studio with the American artist Marguerite Thompson. In 1911, Dismorr contributed several illustrations to John Middleton Murry's avant-garde Rhythm magazine. During July 1912 she showed three landscapes, to favourable reviews, with the Allied Artists Association. Dismorr exhibited with Fergusson and S. J. Peploe in October 1912 at the Stafford Gallery in London. From 1912 to 1914 Dismorr also exhibited at the Salon d'Automne in Paris. In 1912 and 1913, Dismorr exhibited Fauvist influenced work with the Allied Artists Association. The Fauvist influence is said to have resulted from her studies at the Académie de La Palette.

== Vorticism ==
Dismorr met Wyndham Lewis in 1913 and by 1914 had become a member of the Rebel Art Centre. She maintained a studio in the Kings Road, Chelsea, London, as well as taking frequent trips to France. Dismorr was a signatory to the Vorticist manifesto published in the first issue of their literary magazine, Blast in 1914, and also contributed illustrations and a written piece, Monologue, to the second issue in 1915. She shared the group's depiction of the dynamics of the machine and their desire to challenge the public's conservative views on art but little of her work from this period survives. The four works she contributed to the Vorticist exhibition in 1915 are now thought to be lost, as is the original of The Engine which was reproduced in an edition of Blast. Both the Victoria and Albert Museum and the Tate hold one example each of Dismorr's work from this period and the collector John Quinn displayed several examples in New York in December 1916. Dismorr exhibited with the Vorticists again in New York in January 1917 at the Penguin Club.

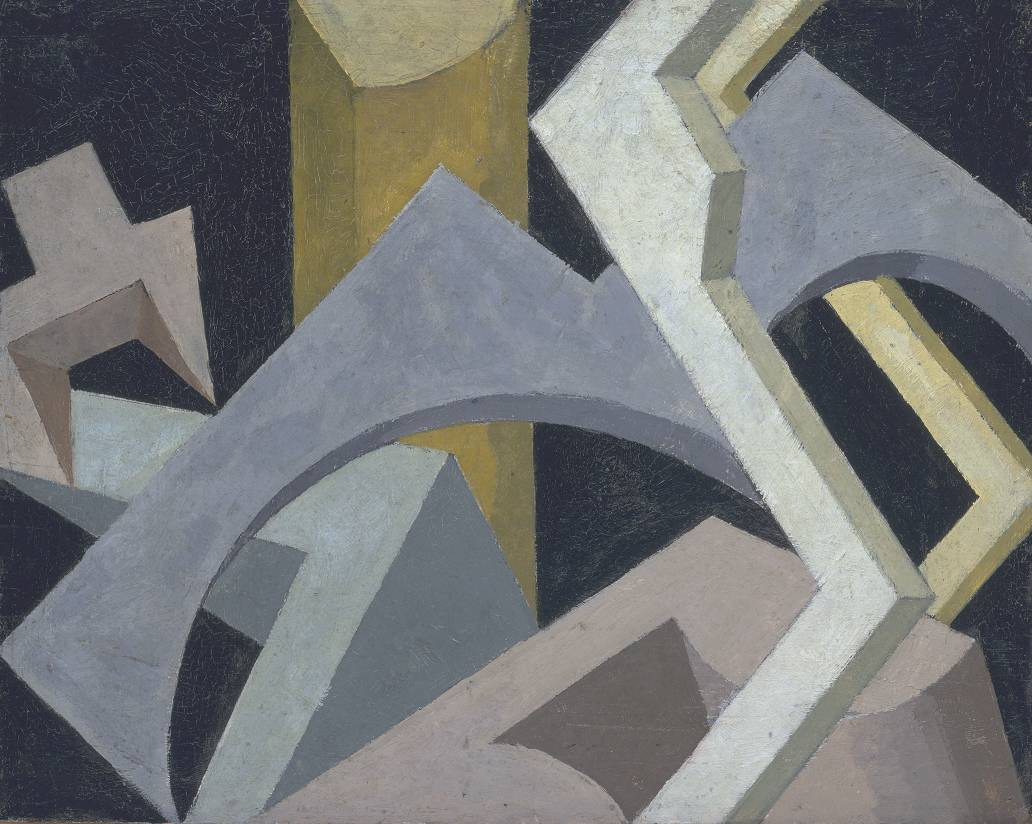
Abstract composition ca. 1915

Apart from Dismorr, the only other female member of the Vorticist group was Helen Saunders. William Roberts's painting The Vorticists at the Restaurant de la Tour Eiffel, Spring 1915, from 1961–62, shows the seven males dominating the foreground and the two women behind with Dismorr in the doorway being the furthest away. According to Kate Lechmere, the financial backer of Blast and the Rebel Art Centre, Dismorr had a difficult relationship with Wyndham Lewis, and was, along with Helen Saunders, one of the "little lapdogs who wanted to be Lewis’s slaves and do everything for him". Lechmere claimed that on one occasion Dismorr stripped naked in Oxford Street to demonstrate she would do anything Lewis asked of her. Dismorr and Wyndham Lewis fell out in 1925 when she refused to purchase some drawings from him when he was short of money but they appeared to have resumed a cordial friendship in 1928 when she did lend him some funds. Robin Ody, a close friend and the executor of Dismorr's will (in which all the beneficiaries were women), summed her up as "the Edwardian phenomenon of the new woman". Ody considered that she did not have a physical relationship with Lewis. Lechmere's relationship with Lewis ended bitterly, and she carried out a legal struggle to recover money owed her by him. Lechmere had provided all the funds to pay for the Rebel Art Centre, where the Vorticists first met in 1914—a fact which Lewis had to admit to Christopher Nevinson who had not wanted "any of these damned women" in the group.

== World War I ==
During World War I Dismorr served as a nurse in France and then as a bilingual field officer with the American Friends Service Committee. After the war Dismorr was at the centre of the London avant-garde world, acquainted with both T. S. Eliot and Ezra Pound, with her poems and illustrations being published in various publications. During 1919 several poems by Dismorr were published in The Little Review but following a highly critical article by A.Y. Winters she did not submit any more for publication until the 1930s. Early in 1920 Dismorr had a handful of paintings shown, in group shows, at both the Mansard Gallery and the New Art Salon.

From 1920 until 1924 she appears to have had no settled home and travelled throughout Europe, spending time in Paris, the Alpes-Maritimes and in both London and Folkestone. She had a nervous breakdown in 1920 and received medical advice not to paint. Lewis suspected that it was her modern style that was causing the doctors concern, and wrote to her that "the best possible distraction for you would be to paint".

== Later life ==
In 1924 Dismorr began a series of water colour paintings of music hall performers, a popular subject at the time. In 1925 her first solo exhibition was held at the Mayor Gallery in London. R. H. Wilenski wrote the introduction to the exhibition cataloue. The exhibition included a series of water colours of landscapes painted in France, Italy, Spain, Scotland and England. A Fauve type composition, Pyrenean Town, was reproduced in reviews of the show and also shown at the Seven and Five Society. Caring for her ill mother left Dismorr little time to paint and throughout 1926 she mostly showed previously displayed works.

Both her mother and sister Blanche died in 1926 and Dismorr herself was ill during 1927. Dismorr recovered and between 1927 and 1934 exhibited some twenty-six figurative pieces with the London Group. In the early 1930s these included a series of portraits of poets, including Dylan Thomas, Cecil Day Lewis and William Empson.

She exhibited with Charles Ginner and Barbara Hepworth in the London Group, as well as with Ivon Hitchens and Ben Nicholson in the Seven and Five Society, having joined both groups in 1926. Dismorr showed with the anti-fascist Artists' International Association in the early 1930s and again in 1937. Dismorr was one of seven British women artists included in the 1936 Die Olympiade ouder Dictatwar exhibition in Amsterdam which aimed to counter the Nazi condemnation of Modernism and modern art.

Dismorr produced several pointillist self-portraits alongside portraits of her mother and female friends. One of these was of the artist Catherine Dawson Giles, whom Dismorr had known since 1904 when they met in Etaples. The two had also travelled together on painting expeditions in Europe in the 1920s. For several years Dismorr had lived at the Giles family home in London and also had a studio at Giles' cottage at Alfriston in Sussex. Throughout her final years, Dismorr continued painting and exhibiting her work, which became completely abstract during the late 1930s. She exhibited with the Association Abstraction-Creation. She contributed her work, "Related Forms" to Axis magazine in 1937 (no 8: 25).

Dismorr died by suicide by hanging in London on 29 August 1939, five days before Britain declared war on Germany.

== Later exhibitions and research ==
A joint exhibition of works by Dismorr and Giles was held in 2000 at the Fine Art Society in London, with a catalogue written by Quentin Stevenson. Pallant House Gallery held an exhibition of the works of Dismorr and her contemporaries in early 2020. The exhibition was curated by the Gallery in partnership with Dr Alicia Foster.

Catherine Heathcock's (unpublished) PhD thesis contains a complete catalogue of Dismorr's works. The letters between Dismorr and Lewis are now held at Cornell University.
