= Helen Saunders =

English painter (1885–1963)

- Born: 4 April 1885; Bedford Park, Ealing, London, England
- Died: 1 January 1963 (aged 77); Holborn, London, England
- Education: Slade School of Art; Central School of Arts and Crafts
- Known for: Painting

Helen Saunders (4 April 1885 – 1 January 1963) was an English painter associated with the Vorticist movement.

== Biography ==
Helen Saunders (pronounced Saːnders) was born in Bedford Park, Ealing, London. When eighteen years' old she enrolled at a newly opened local studio run by Rosa Waugh Hobhouse who recognised her talent and encouraged her to study at the Slade School of Art which Saunders attended three days a week in 1907. She later attended the Central School of Arts and Crafts which offered more technical training than the Slade. By 1912 Saunders' work had become "recognisably Post Impressionist", and in February her painting "Rocks, North Devon" was accepted by The Friday Club (an exhibiting group set up by Vanessa Bell). She exhibited works at Galerie Barbazanges and at the Allied Artists Association.

Abstract Multicoloured Design, 1915, Tate Gallery.

Saunders exhibited in the Twentieth Century Art exhibition at the Whitechapel Gallery in 1914, one of the first British artists to work in a nonfigurative style. In 1915 she became associated with the Vorticists through the artist Wyndham Lewis, signing the Vorticist's manifesto in the first edition of the literary magazine BLAST and contributing to their inaugural exhibition. She and Jessica Dismorr were the only female members. Saunders was fluent in both French and German and during World War I worked in the office of the United Kingdom Government Censor.

Saunders exhibited with the London Group in 1916, but from 1920 she increasingly turned away from the avant-garde and adopted a more realist style, working in still life, landscapes and portraiture, and latterly exhibiting with the Holborn Art Society. Despite her long career, fewer than 200 of her works are currently known. She was included in the Nasher Museum of Art at Duke University when it hosted an exhibition entitled The Vorticists: Rebel Artists in London and New York, 1914–18 in late 2010. Saunders died of accidental coal gas poisoning at her home in Holborn, London, on 1 January 1963. Later that year, her sister Ethel donated three of her Vorticist drawings to the Tate Gallery, and one to the Victoria and Albert Museum in London.

In 1996 Richard Cork wrote:

"Since Saunders' early work earned her a respected place in experimental circles, the gathering obscurity of her later years seems cruel. She endured the neglect with uncomplaining stoicism, for her innate warmth prevented her from succumbing to bitterness."

In 2022, her painting Atlantic City known from a photograph in BLAST, was found beneath the painting Praxitella by Wyndham Lewis.

== Notable works ==
- Abstract Multicoloured Design, c.1915. Gouache, watercolour and graphite on paper. Tate.
- Monochrome Abstract Composition, c.1915. Ink, watercolour and graphite on paper. Tate.

== Exhibition History ==
- Drawings Gallery Display - Helen Saunders, The Courtauld Gallery, London, 14/10/2022-29/01/2023
- Women in Abstraction, Centre-Pompidou, Paris, 05/05/2021-23/08/2021
- Blast to Freeze, Les Abattoirs, Toulouse, France, 24/02/2003-11/05/2003
- Modern Art in Britain 1910-1914, Barbican Art Gallery, London, 20/02/1997-26/05/1997
- Helen Saunders (1885-1963), Ashmolean Museum, Oxford, 09/01/1996-03/03/1996; Graves Art Gallery, Sheffield, 16/03/1996-20/04/1996
- Vorticism and its allies, Hayward Gallery, London, 27/03/1974-02/06/1974

== See also ==
- Kate Lechmere
