= Henry Tidey =

Henry Tidey (7 January 1814 – 21 July 1872) was a British watercolourist.

== Life ==
The younger brother of Alfred Tidey, he was born at Worthing House, Worthing, on 7 January 1814. Like his brother, he was taught drawing in his father John Tidey's school. While still a boy, he painted several pictures for Princess Augusta, who was then staying in Worthing. He later worked there as a painter of portraits, in oil and in watercolours. Subsequently, in London, he was a successful portrait-painter, especially of children.

Tidey died at 30 Percy Street, London, on 21 July 1872. His remaining drawings and sketches were sold by Messrs. Christie, Manson, & Woods on 28 March 1873.

== Works ==
In 1839 Tidey sent a portrait in watercolours to the exhibition of the Royal Academy, where he continued to exhibit mainly portraits until 1861. Occasionally he painted genre pictures in oil. In 1855 he exhibited there for the first time a watercolour drawing, of Lieutenant-colonel Pakenham at the battle of the Alma. He then concentrated on history painting, and poetical subjects, somewhat after the manner of Watteau.

Tidey was elected an associate of the New Society of Painters in Watercolours in 1858, and in that year sent to its exhibition three drawings, Idleness, The Wanderer, and The Oyster Season—Natives of Hampshire. In 1859 he became a full member, and exhibited The Feast of Roses, from Thomas Moore's Lalla Rookh, which was purchased by Queen Victoria, and three other drawings.

Later works included:

- Queen Mab in 1860;
- Dar-Thula, a subject from Ossian, bought by the Duke of Manchester, and Walter and Jane, engraved by William Holl, in 1861;
- The Last of the Abencerages in 1862;
- Christ blessing little Children in 1863;
- The Night of the Betrayal, a triptych, in 1864;
- Nanny, wilt thou gang wi' me? engraved by William Holl, in 1865;
- Sensitive Plants, a series of drawings of children, in 1866 and 1867;
- The Seasons, four drawings, in 1867;
- Jeanie Morrison and The Woman of Samaria, the latter engraved for The Art Journal by Thomas Sherratt, in 1868;
- Sardanapalus in 1870;
- Seaweeds and Flowers of the Forest in 1871; and
- Richard and Kate, two different compositions bearing the same title, Castles in the Air, and Sanctuary in 1872.

== Notes ==
Attribution

This article incorporates text from a publication now in the public domain: Lee, Sidney, ed. (1898). "Tidey, Henry". Dictionary of National Biography. Vol. 56. London: Smith, Elder & Co.
