= William Roberts (painter) =

British painter (1895–1980)

William Roberts RA
- William Roberts (1970)
- Born: William Patrick Roberts; 5 June 1895; Hackney, London, UKGBI
- Died: 20 January 1980 (aged 84); Royal Free Hospital, London, UK
- Education: Saint Martin's School of Art; Slade School of Fine Art
- Known for: Painting
- Spouse: Sarah Roberts (m. 1922)
- Children: 1
- Relatives: Jacob Kramer (brother-in-law)

William Patrick Roberts RA (5 June 1895 – 20 January 1980) was a British painter.

In the years before the First World War Roberts was a pioneer, among English artists, in his use of abstract images. In later years he described his approach as that of an "English Cubist". In the First World War he served as a gunner on the Western Front, and in 1918 became an official war artist. Roberts's first one-man show was at the Chenil Gallery in London in 1923, and a number of his paintings from the twenties were purchased by the Contemporary Art Society for provincial galleries in the UK. In the 1930s it could be argued that Roberts was artistically at the top of his game; but, although his work was exhibited regularly in London and, increasingly, internationally, he always struggled financially. This situation became worse during the Second World War – although Roberts did carry out some commissions as a war artist.

Roberts is probably best remembered for the large, complex and colourful compositions that he exhibited annually at the Royal Academy summer exhibition from the 1950s until his death. He had a major retrospective at the Tate Gallery in 1965, and was elected a full member of the Royal Academy in 1966. There has recently been a revival of interest in the work of this artist who always worked outside the mainstream.

== Early life and education ==
Roberts was born on 5 June 1895 in Hackney, London to Edward Roberts, a carpenter, and Emma Roberts (née Collins). The third of four children, Roberts maternal grandmother was from Cork whilst his mother was potentially of Irish descent. (Note: Roberts' mother is cited as being born in Cork and Islington.)

From an early age Roberts showed an outstanding talent for drawing, and this was encouraged by his parents and by his school teachers. He left school at the age of 14 and took up an apprenticeship with the advertising firm of Sir Joseph Causton Ltd, intending to become a poster designer. He attended evening classes at Saint Martin's School of Art in London and won a London County Council scholarship to the Slade School of Art – freeing him from the obligations of his apprenticeship. He joined the Slade in 1911, studying under Henry Tonks and Wilson Steer. His contemporaries at the Slade included a number of brilliant young students, among them Dora Carrington, Mark Gertler, Paul Nash, Christopher Nevinson, Stanley Spencer, David Bomberg and Bernard Meninsky. The Slade's emphasis on the importance of drawing and sound structuring of composition would inform Roberts's later work. In 1912 he won the Slade's Melville Nettleship prize for Figure Composition. He then spent the summer at Bourton, near Shrivenham, as a guest of Cyril Kendall Butler, a committee member of the Contemporary Art Society, who regularly accommodated and subsequently often purchased works by many of Roberts's Slade teachers, such as Steer and Tonks.

== An English Cubist ==
Roberts was intrigued by Post-Impressionism and Cubism, an interest fuelled by his friendships at the Slade (in particular with Bomberg) as well as by his travels in France and Italy after leaving the Slade in 1913. Later in 1913 he joined Roger Fry's Omega Workshops for three mornings a week. The ten shillings a time that Omega paid enabled him to create challenging Cubist-style paintings such as The Return of Ulysses (now owned by the Castle Museum and Art Gallery in Nottingham). After leaving Omega he was taken up by Wyndham Lewis, who was forming a British alternative to Futurism. Ezra Pound had suggested the name Vorticism, and Roberts's work was featured in both editions of the Vorticist literary magazine BLAST. Roberts was a signatory to the Vorticist Manifesto that appeared in the first edition of the magazine. Roberts himself preferred the description "Cubist" for his work of this period. Two large-scale oil paintings exhibited in the 1917 Penguin Club Vorticist exhibition in New York, and purchased by John Quinn, were subsequently lost, but the radical nature of Roberts's "Cubist style" is evidenced by The Toe Dancer (owned by the Victoria and Albert Museum) and the recently rediscovered Boxers – both exhibited with the London Group in 1915.

== First World War ==
The First German Gas Attack at Ypres, 1918, National Gallery of Canada

In 1916 Roberts enlisted in the Royal Regiment of Artillery as a gunner, serving on the Western Front in the Ypres sector, north of the Menin Road and at Arras. Having been on active service for the best part of two years, he successfully applied to the Canadian War Records Office for a commission to paint a large-scale war subject. In April 1918 he returned to London as an official war artist, with the proviso that the work should not be in the Cubist style. The outcome of the commission was The First German Gas Attack at Ypres, a powerful expressionist work that is on permanent display in the Canadian War Museum in Ottawa. Roberts was subsequently commissioned by the British Ministry of Information, for whom he painted A Shell Dump, France (1918–19), now in the Imperial War Museum collection along with twelve watercolour drawings of his experiences at the front They rival the bitterness and social realism of the German artists Otto Dix and George Grosz. In 1978 Roberts published a memoir of his experiences at the front – 4.5 Howitzer Gunner RFA: Memories of the War to End War 1914–1918.

== 1920s ==
Roberts had met Sarah Kramer (1900–92) in 1915 through her brother Jacob Kramer, who also had studied at the Slade. Roberts had been writing to Sarah from the front, and shortly after the war was over they set up home together and had a son, John David Roberts (1919–95). They moved into rented rooms in Fitzrovia and were married in 1922. Roberts exhibited with Wyndham Lewis's Group X, and Osbert Sitwell was an early patron.

Alongside his dramatic Cubist work, Roberts was a talented portrait painter. He honed his skills with portraits of Sarah – she would be his model and muse for the next 60 years. In 1923, while Roberts was preparing for a one-man show at the Chenil Gallery, Chelsea, the artist Colin Gill put Roberts in touch with T. E. Lawrence, who commissioned a series of portraits for his book Seven Pillars of Wisdom. Finally shaking off his association with Wyndham Lewis, Roberts had evolved a unique and highly recognisable 'English Cubist' style. His subject matter turned to urban life in London with paintings such as Bank Holiday in the Park and At the Hippodrome, which were exhibited with the London Group, and The Cinema – later acquired by the Tate Gallery. At this stage his oeuvre was quite broad, including scenes from 'Greek Mythology [and] Christian Mythology', as he put it. Lawrence commissioned further illustrations and decorations for Seven Pillars of Wisdom, and there were also commissions of literary portraits and cover designs for private presses – such as a portrait of H. E. Bates for the New Coterie magazine in 1927. It was the purchase of a number of his paintings by the Contemporary Art Society for major provincial art galleries that kept Roberts financially afloat. He supplemented his income by teaching a life class with Bernard Meninsky at the Central School of Art for one day a week from 1925 – a post he held until 1960. Towards the end of the twenties his work became less down-beat. For example, The Tea Garden (1928) and The Chess Players (1929) provide a light take on social interaction and were perfectly in tune with the fashionable Art Deco style.

== 1930s ==
In the 1930s the angular style of Roberts's earlier work was replaced by a rounder, more sculptural approach. This change in style is, for example, apparent in the double portrait of John Maynard Keynes and Lydia Lopokova in the National Portrait Gallery, London. Keynes became an important patron of Roberts through the London Artists' Association, and the paintings that Keynes purchased are now in the collection of King's College, Cambridge. While Roberts was critical of the financial support that he received from the London Artists' Association, it is difficult to imagine how the family would have survived without this patronage. Later he would describe the thirties as "the years of economic struggle". A number of striking large-scale canvases were undertaken in the early thirties, such as The Masks (1934) and The Playground (The Gutter) (1934–5), both works being exhibited at the Carnegie Institute, Pittsburgh, and in New York. Despite their financial position the family occasionally took holidays: they travelled to Spain for the first time in the early 1930s and went on a cycling holiday to Brighton that apparently inspired Les Routiers. Andrew Heard suggests that Roberts may have used a French title for this work as a nod towards the work of Fernand Léger, whose "tubist" forms have some similarity to Roberts's figures.

== 1940s ==
Soon after the Second World War broke out, in September 1939 William and Sarah left London for Oxford. Roberts was too old for combat service, but enquired about the possibility of getting 'some pictorial propaganda work to do'. He was frustrated at being offered only minor assignments for the War Artists' Advisory Committee. However, he did complete two commissions documenting life on the home front – Munitions Factory (1940) and The Control Room, Civil Defence Headquarters(1942) – both now in Salford Art Gallery. William and Sarah eventually spent most of the war years in a flat in Marston on the outskirts of Oxford. Roberts managed to get a one-day-a-week teaching job at Oxford Technical College. Throughout his life he drew inspiration from his surroundings, and a number of watercolour drawings from this period show rural scenes on the River Cherwell and a nearby Gypsy camp.

In 1946 he and Sarah returned to London and took a room at 14 St Mark's Crescent, a house in multiple occupancy backing on to the Regent's Canal, near Primrose Hill. When other tenants moved out the Robertses took over additional rooms, and eventually, with financial help from a friend of Sarah's, they were able to buy the whole house. This house remained their home for the rest of their lives and the neighbourhood would provide Roberts with subject matter. The Roberts's son, John, joined them. He had studied physics at University College London, and became a poet and guitar scholar. In 1948 Roberts showed work at the Royal Academy summer exhibition for the first time – a self-portrait and a portrait of Sarah in a headscarf as The Gypsy – and he would show work there in every subsequent year until his death.

== The Royal Academy and the "Vortex Pamphlets" ==
In the 1950s, when cutting-edge British art was abstract, Roberts's work was in danger of seeming out of date. Roberts re-evaluated the Royal Academy as an exhibiting opportunity, as it attracted large and diverse crowds that were generally more interested in representational art than in abstraction, as well as press coverage. From this point on Roberts's annual contribution became increasingly sensational – spectacular in scale, in use of colour and in dramatic subject matter. The Temptation of St Anthony (1951), Revolt in the Desert (1952) and The Birth of Venus (1954) dominated the walls of the RA and were a talking point in the press and with the public. Roberts now had a new patron – Ernest Cooper, who ran a chain of health-food shops under the banner of the London Health Centre. As well as purchasing a large number of these Royal Academy paintings, Cooper commissioned Roberts to design illustrations for his mail-order catalogues and instructional pamphlets.

In 1956 the Tate Gallery held an exhibition entitled Wyndham Lewis and Vorticism, with 150 works by Lewis and a small selection by other artists to give "an indication of the effect of his immediate impact upon his contemporaries". Roberts was offended that the catalogue "would lead the uninitiated to suppose that the artists designated as 'Other Vorticists' are in some way subservient to Lewis", and published a series of "Vortex Pamphlets", in which he railed against the exhibition, the catalogue, the press coverage and the account of his own career contained in Modern English Painters by the Tate's director, John Rothenstein, which appeared at about the same time. Targets of earlier visual satires had included Walter Sickert and Roger Fry. To publicise his own work he also published Some Early Abstract and Cubist Work 1913–1920 (London, 1957), the first of a series of collections of reproductions of his paintings, with somewhat polemical prefaces.

== Late recognition ==
In 1958 Roberts was elected an Associate of the Royal Academy, and two years later, when he turned 65, he retired from his one-day-a-week teaching position at the Central School. However, his output as an artist over the next fifteen years remained prolific. In 1961 he was given an award by the Calouste Gulbenkian Foundation "in recognition of his artistic achievement and his outstanding service to British painting". In that same year he began painting The Vorticists at the Restaurant de la Tour Eiffel, Spring 1915 (completed 1962; now in the Tate Gallery), a nostalgic recollection of a boisterous Vorticist gathering in 1915 that can be read as an attempt by Roberts to build bridges following the "Vortex Pamphlets" debacle. A major retrospective of his work, organised by the Arts Council of Great Britain and curated by Ronald Alley, opened at the Tate Gallery in 1965, and a smaller version was also shown in Newcastle and Manchester. In the same year Roberts was offered, but rejected, an OBE. He was, however, pleased to be elected a full member of the Royal Academy in 1966. While still tackling a variety of subjects, Roberts became somewhat obsessed with the self-portrait, and a number of his self-portraits would be exhibited by the National Portrait Gallery in 1984.

Roberts was often described as reclusive, and he was very wary about interviewers – especially after an Observer journalist who visited him produced an article that Roberts felt was concerned more with his rather spartan lifestyle than with his work. "What kind of art critic is this, who sets out to criticise my pictures, but criticises my gas stove and kitchen table instead?" he asked.

In 1974 the Arts Council exhibition "Vorticism and Its Allies", curated by Richard Cork, recognised Roberts's important role within the group; however, when Cork approached him for an interview Roberts was uncooperative.

Unsurprisingly, in his eighties Roberts's draughtsmanship deteriorated, but he continued working until the end – Donkey Rides was "pinned to his drawing board on the day on which he died [20 Jan. 1980]".

== The fate of his estate ==
Sarah Roberts died in 1992 and her and William's son, John, died two and a half years later, intestate. John had set up the family house, 14 St Mark's Crescent, as a "house museum" with a changing selection of his father's paintings on show to friends. It was estimated that there were almost 475 paintings and drawings in the house at the time of his death, and the Tate Gallery agreed to store them for safe keeping. The fate of these works was of concern when The Guardian in 2004 revealed that the Treasury Solicitor, who had control of John's estate, refused to lend to the major Roberts retrospective, curated by Andrew Heard, at the Hatton Gallery in Newcastle upon Tyne and the Graves Art Gallery in Sheffield. Since then the collection has been saved, with 117 of these works having been allocated to the Tate in lieu of inheritance tax, and the Tate continuing to house the remainder until the period when claims may be made on the estate has expired, when they too will enter the Tate collection. A number of the drawings allocated to the Tate went on display at Tate Britain in 2012–13. In 2004 William Roberts: An English Cubist by Andrew Gibbon Williams, the standard monograph on this painter, was published.

Between 1998 and 2015 the William Roberts Society furthered the appreciation and promotion of Roberts's work, being established as a registered charity in 2002 and publishing regular newsletters and occasional pamphlets.

English Heritage unveiled a blue plaque at 14 St Mark's Crescent in 2003. A short film William Roberts: An Artist's House is accessible on YouTube. In 2007 Pallant House Gallery staged an exhibition William Roberts: England at Play, curated by Simon Martin. The sale of the Evill/Frost collection at Sotheby's in London in 2011 saw unprecedentedly high prices for Roberts's work, and in the following year The Chess Players (1929–30) was sold for over £1 million, also at Sotheby's.
