= Saxon Sydney-Turner =

British civil servant, member of Bloomsbury Group

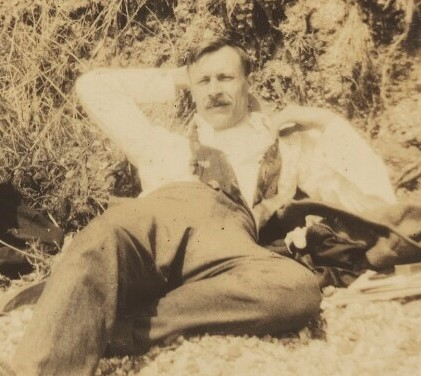
Saxon Sydney-Turner 1917

Saxon Arnoll Sydney-Turner (Note: Middle name sometimes mistakenly spelled Arnold, but see A Cambridge Alumni Database: https://venn.lib.cam.ac.uk/cgi-bin/search-2018.pl?sur=sydney-turner&suro=w&fir=saxon&firo=c&cit=&cito=c&c=all&z=all&tex=&sye=1898&eye=1903&col=all&maxcount=50) (28 October 1880 – 4 November 1962) was a member of the Bloomsbury Group who worked as a British civil servant throughout his life.

== Early life ==
Sydney-Turner was the son of a Gloucester surgeon who moved to Brighton in 1893. He attended Westminster School and then read classics at Trinity College, Cambridge where he was a contemporary of Leonard Woolf, Thoby Stephen and Clive Bell. He was very well-read and fiercely intellectual. Lytton Strachey wrote of him:

When I first knew him he was a wild and unrestrained freshman who wrote poems, never went to bed, and declaimed Swinburne and Sir Thomas Browne till four o’clock in the morning in the Great Court at Trinity. He is now... quite pale and inanimate, hardly more than an incompletely galvanized dead body.

Leonard Woolf wrote of the older Sydney-Turner, "He looks sometimes like a little schoolboy whom life has bullied into unconsciousness."

Although he did not socialise easily, he was elected a member of the Cambridge Apostles where he spoke very little at meetings. He had wide intellectual and aesthetic interests: poetry, painting, puzzles and music (particularly Wagnerian opera).

== Work ==
Having obtained a double first, he did well enough in the Civil Service examinations to become a civil servant in the Inland Revenue from which he was later promoted to Treasury following this career throughout his life. He was a clerk in the Estate Duty Office from 1904-1912 and was in the Treasury from 1913.

== Bloomsbury Group ==
Through his university friendships, Sydney-Turner became a member of the Bloomsbury Group where his intellectual erudition could be intimidating. However, he sometimes would spend many hours at their discussion meetings without saying anything at all. In 1917 he joined in a scheme to purchase The Mill House, Tidmarsh, the place lived in by Lytton Strachey, Dora Carrington and Ralph Partridge and which he occasionally visited.

== Personal life ==
Sydney-Turner never married and, unlike many associated with Bloomsbury, it does not seem he was sexually active. He fell in love with the artist Barbara Hiles, a friend of Dora Carrington, but, when she decided to marry Nick Bagenal, (Note: Barbara Hiles, 1891–1984; Nicholas Bagenal, 1891–1974.) Sydney-Turner refused her offer to stay as her lover. He remained a close friend of Hiles and her children.

He was a kind and unambitious person whose friend Leonard Woolf described him as "an eccentric in the best English tradition who wrote elegant verse and music and possessed an extraordinary supple, and enigmatic mind". However, Gerald Brenan called him "one of the greatest bores I have ever known" and Lytton Strachey, although a friend at Cambridge, later said of him "there was probably no one less entertaining in the world".

== Later years ==
Sydney-Turner gambled away nearly all his money on horse racing. By the end of his life, he had become reduced to living in a meagre flat.

His Times obituary by L. W. (Leonard Woolf) said he was a "remarkable man and strange character" and an English eccentric. He lived for over thirty years in a furnished apartment in Great Ormond Street with a large sitting room and a very small bedroom where he kept a stack of "good pictures" by Duncan Grant and other artists. The sitting room fireplace had the same picture on each side, an immense picture of a farmyard scene. At Trinity, he got a university scholarship as he was the only candidate who translated correctly a Greek passage with a riddle in it. In later life, he was a champion solver of crossword puzzles and wrote elegant verse and music but published nothing.

His only published writings are his contributions to Euphrosyne: a collection of verse (1905).

== Notes and references ==
Notes

Bibliography

- Holroyd, Michael (1994), Lytton Strachey, Chatto & Windus, ISBN 0-7011-6086-1
