= Barbara Hiles =

Portrait of Barbara Hiles Bagenal by Ray Strachey, oil on board, late 1920s or early 1930s, National Portrait Gallery collection, London

Barbara Hiles Bagenal (Note: She was known by both her maiden and married name) (1891–1984) was an artist associated with members of the Bloomsbury Group, primarily Vanessa Bell and Saxon Sydney-Turner. She was a long-time friend of fellow "Bohemian" and artist Dora Carrington.

== Bloomsbury Group ==
In 1917, Hiles tented on the lawn of Vanessa Bell's Charleston property, which she shared with Duncan Grant. In a letter Bell wrote to her sister Virginia Woolf from Charleston on 23 July 1917, she notes:

"...We have had a terrific party here for the week-end. Clive and Mary, Saxon, who suddenly telegraphed to ask if he could come and is still here, and Barbara in her tent, who spent most of the time here. I don't know how long she means to stay there. She said a week or two, but I strongly suspect she'll stay all the summer. As long as she doesn't bring all the world about our ears I don't mind, as she's very independent, but one's rather at the mercy of people if they choose to camp at one's door..."

== Personal life ==
Despite the offer from Saxon Sydney-Turner Hiles decided to marry Nick Bagenal, although Hiles proposed that Sydney-Turner remain her lover in an open relationship between the three of them. Bell refers to this in several letters, one offering advice to the heartbroken Sydney-Turner, and then an exchange with her sister sharing the gossip of the day:

VW to VB on 29 January 1918:

"Think of the three of them discussing the question over the stove in her studio and Nick saying 'No, Saxon: you must marry her;' and Saxon refusing to be happy save in their happiness, and Barbara suggesting copulation with each on alternate nights."

VB to VW on 13 February 1918:

"I suppose if you're ill (Note: VW was suffering from the 1918 flu pandemic) I shan't get more gossip yet, though Duncan and I laughed over the last batch until we nearly cried. Have you seen Saxon lately? He writes rather melancholy letters, poor old thing, though very high-minded of course and full of the most unselfish problems. I think your description of the conversation a trois must have been exactly true to life. Lord, what characters. I myself think Barbara has behaved idiotically and will live to regret it, but there's no use saying so now. But how anyone with the imagination of an owl can conceive of life as she conceives it passes me — half the year with one, half with the other, a child by each, etc., and no one to have any jealousy or cause for complaint, and she like a looking-glass in the middle, reflecting each in turn. Poor old Saxon of course sees that it won't be so. He will be too like the poor old bachelor, faithful and solitary in Gt. Ormond St. long after we're all dead, supporting Barbara's children (by Nick) I daresay."

Hiles was also associated with Bloomsbury member John Maynard Keynes; perhaps his only heterosexual interest until he met and fell in love with Lydia Lopokova.

Hiles Bagenal remained a friend (if not lover) of Sydney-Turner throughout her marriage. Bell's comments are somewhat ironic given her own history married to Clive Bell, bearing his children, both Bells openly taking long-term lovers while never divorcing or completely separating, and Vanessa Bell bearing a last child with Duncan Grant.

In fact in the 1950s Hiles Bagenal herself became Clive Bell's companion (if not lover), apparently referred to openly as "Little Ba" by the Bells and Grants and among friends. In a 1958 letter to her friend Jane Bussy Vanessa Bell writes:

"...We went not long ago to see the new Courtauld exhibition. Don't you think it rather wonderful that such a well-arranged and charming show should have sprung up in Bloomsbury? There are certain faults in Roger's part which I hope we may manage to put right — one painting attributed to Duncan which certainly isn't by him, and some horrible pottery bought at Woolworth's I should think, but on the whole it's very well done. (I believe Little Ba [Barbara Bagenal] intends to install herself there and paint the view from the window.) She and Clive seem very vague about their winter plans, but I expect you will soon have them on you. I rather wish they'd go by train or air and hire a car in Menton, but I believe B. is against that."

== Notes and references ==
Notes
