= Alfred Tidey =

English painter

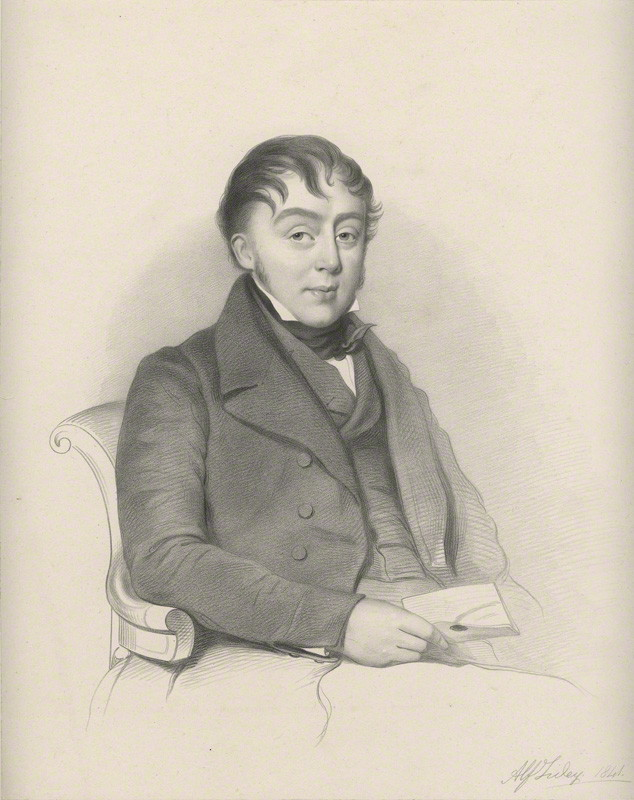
- Alfred Tidey, 1841 lithograph by Richard James Lane
- Born: 20 April 1808; Worthing, Sussex, England
- Died: 2 April 1892 (aged 83); Acton, Middlesex, England
- Education: Royal Academy Schools
- Occupation: painter
- Known for: Portrait miniatures
- Notable work: miniature of Sir John Conroy, watercolour drawing As Good as Gold
- Father: John Tidey
- Relatives: Henry Tidey (brother)

Alfred Tidey (1808–1892) was an English miniature-painter.

== Life ==
The second son of John Tidey, schoolmaster, he was born at Worthing House, Worthing, Sussex, on 20 April 1808; Henry Tidey was his younger brother. His first instruction in art was at his father's school. While still young he came to London, where he attracted the notice of Henry Neville, 2nd Earl of Abergavenny.

Tidey died at Glen Elg, Springfield Park, Acton, Middlesex, on 2 April 1892.

== Works ==
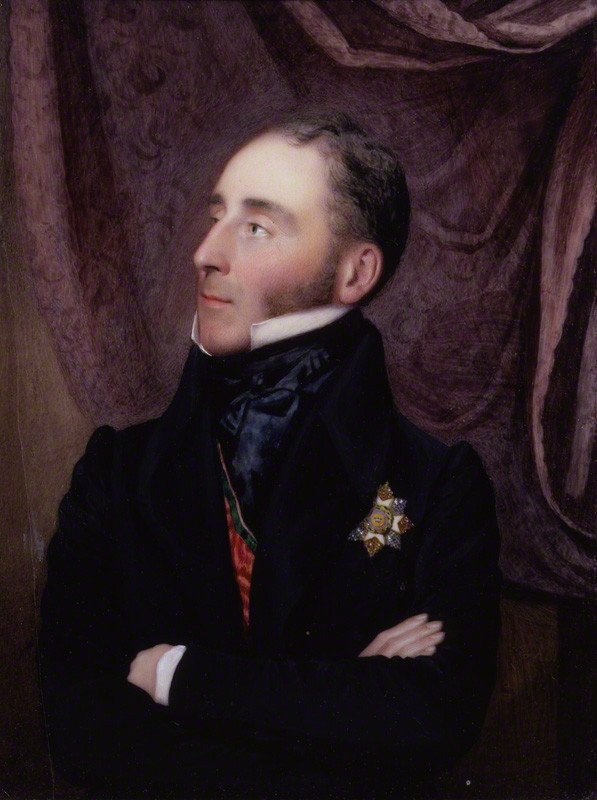
Sir John Conroy, 1836 portrait by Alfred Tidey

Tidey began to exhibit at the Royal Academy in 1831, and in 1836 he sent a miniature of Sir John Conroy, comptroller of the household to the Duchess of Kent. The Duchess's daughter Queen Victoria in 1841 commanded him to paint a miniature of the Hon. Julia Henrietta Anson, one of her maids of honour, later Lady Brooke, which was engraved by James Thomson. He painted also a miniature of the Empress Frederick when a child, and at a later period (1873) watercolour portraits of her and of Princess Victoria of Schleswig-Holstein. He continued to exhibit miniatures at the Royal Academy regularly until 1857, but seldom after that date.

Tidey exhibited some watercolour drawings, ending in 1887 with one entitled As Good as Gold. Three of his final works appeared in 1891 in the exhibition of the Dudley Gallery Art Society, of which he was a member.

== Notes ==
Attribution

This article incorporates text from a publication now in the public domain: Lee, Sidney, ed. (1898). "Tidey, Alfred". Dictionary of National Biography. Vol. 56. London: Smith, Elder & Co.
