= Richard Cork =

British art historian, editor, critic, broadcaster and exhibition curator

Richard Cork (born 25 March 1947) is a British art historian, editor, critic, broadcaster and exhibition curator. He has been an art critic for the Evening Standard, The Listener, The Times and the New Statesman. Cork was also editor for Studio International. He is a past Turner Prize judge.

== Early life ==
Richard Cork was educated at Kingswood School, Bath (1960–1964). He read art history at Trinity Hall, Cambridge, and was awarded his doctorate in 1978.

== Career ==
Cork was Slade Professor of Fine Art at Cambridge from 1980 to 1990, and the Henry Moore Senior Fellow at the Courtauld Institute of Art in London from 1992 to 1995. He then served as Chair of the Visual Arts Panel at the Arts Council of England until 1998. Committees he has sat on have included that of the Hayward Gallery, the British Council's Visual Art Committee and the advisory council for the Paul Mellon Centre for Studies in British Art. He has also been on the panel of judges for the Turner Prize and other major art prizes. In 1995 he was a selector for the British Art Show.

Cork's broadcasting work includes reviews of art exhibitions for BBC Radio 4's Front Row, Night Waves on Radio 3 and The Green Room on Radio 2. He also regularly appears on the BBC Two art series The Private Life of a Masterpiece. He has curated exhibitions at the Royal Academy, Tate, Serpentine Gallery, and Hayward galleries in London and, elsewhere in Europe, in Paris, Brussels and Berlin. In Cork's 1978 exhibition, "Art for Whom" at the Serpentine Gallery, "all the work exhibited the idea of community and group experience-a principal of social integration..." (Gablik 12). Cork has a specialist interest in the Vorticist movement and his book on them was for some time the standard text on the movement. In 1995 Cork was given a National Art Collections Fund Award for his international exhibition Art and the First World War, held in London and Berlin. He is currently a Syndic of the Fitzwilliam Museum, Cambridge.

During late modernism, Cork opposed the practice of intellectual elitism derived from formalist abstraction. (Gablik 12) The late critic Peter Fuller (editor of Modern Painters) invented the term 'Corkballs' to describe his form of art criticism. Louisa Buck said Cork was among the "rare species" who search out the latest developments in contemporary art, in contrast to the conventional outlook of many of his colleagues, who "still feel that art should know its place, which is firmly on a plinth or in a frame." She described his dismissal from the Evening Standard (where he was art critic 1969–84): "on a black day for contemporary art, he was succeeded by the fulminating Brian Sewell."

In 2012, Cork wrote "The Healing Presence of Art", an illustrated history of Western art in hospitals. Cork is a patron of Paintings in Hospitals, a charity that provides art for health and social care in England, Wales and Northern Ireland.

== Sources ==
- Gablik, Suzi. Has Modernism Failed. Thames & Hudson, 1985.
