= Blast (British magazine) =

Vorticist magazine

- Cover of the first edition of Blast, 1914
- Editor: Wyndham Lewis
- Categories: Vorticism
- First issue: 1914
- Final issue: 1915
- Language: English

Blast was the short-lived literary magazine of the Vorticist movement in Britain. Two editions were published: the first on 2 July 1914 (dated 20 June 1914, but publication was delayed), featuring a bright pink cover, referred to by Ezra Pound as the "great MAGENTA cover'd opusculus"; and the second a year later on 15 July 1915. Both editions were written primarily by Wyndham Lewis. The magazine is emblematic of the modern art movement in England, and recognised as a seminal text of pre-war 20th-century modernism. The magazine originally cost 2/6.

== Background ==
When the Italian futurist Filippo Tommaso Marinetti visited London in 1910, as part of a series of well-publicised lectures aimed at galvanizing support across Europe for the new Italian avant-garde, his presentation at the Lyceum Club, in which he addressed his audience as "victims of ... traditionalism and its medieval trappings", electrified the assembled avant-garde. Within two years, an exhibition of futurist art at the Sackville Gallery, London, brought futurism squarely into the popular imagination, and the press began to use the term to refer to any forward-looking trends in modern art.

Initially galvanized by Marinetti's verve, Wyndham Lewis—like many other members of the London avant-garde—had become increasingly irritated by the Italian's arrogance. The publication of the English Futurist manifesto Vital English Art, in the June 1914 edition of The Observer, co-written by Marinetti and the "last remaining English Futurist" C. R. W. Nevinson, Lewis found his name, among others, had been added as a signatory at the end of the article without permission, in an attempt to assimilate the English avant-garde for Marinetti's own ends. On 12 June, during recitations of this manifesto and a performance by Marinetti of his poem The Battle of Adrianople, with Nevinson accompanying on drums, Lewis, T. E. Hulme, Jacob Epstein, Henri Gaudier-Brzeska, Edward Wadsworth, and five others roundly interrupted the performance with jeering and shouting. Wyndham Lewis wrote a few days later, "England practically invented this civilisation that Signor Marinetti has come to preach to us about".

The final riposte came with the publication of Blast (later known as Blast 1), written and illustrated by a group of artists assembled by Lewis from "a determined band of miscellaneous anti-futurists". The name Vorticism was coined by the poet Ezra Pound, a close friend of Lewis and the group's main publicist. Writing to James Joyce in April 1914, Pound described the magazine in ambiguous terms: "Lewis is starting a new Futurist, Cubist, Imagiste Quarterly ... I cant tell, it is mostly a painters' magazine with me to do the poems". By July, the magazine had a name, a movement to support, and a typographic style, and it had forged a distinctly English identity, confident enough to praise Kandinsky, question Picasso, and openly mock Marinetti.

== Editions ==
Blast 1 was edited and largely written by Wyndham Lewis with contributions from Pound, Gaudier-Brzeska, Epstein, Spencer Gore, Wadsworth, and Rebecca West and included an extract from Ford Madox Hueffer's novel The Saddest Story, better known by its later title The Good Soldier (published under his subsequent pseudonym, Ford Madox Ford). The first edition was printed in folio format, with the oblique title Blast splashed across its bright pink soft cover. Inside, Lewis used a range of bold typographic innovations to engage the reader, that are reminiscent of Marinetti's contemporary concrete poetry such as Zang Tumb Tumb. Rather than conventional serif fonts, some of the text is set in sans-serif "grotesque" fonts.

The opening twenty pages of Blast 1 contain the Vorticist manifesto, written by Lewis and signed by him, Wadsworth, Pound, William Roberts, Helen Saunders, Lawrence Atkinson, Jessica Dismorr, and Gaudier-Brzeska. Epstein chose not to sign the manifesto, although his work was featured. There is also a (positive) critique of Kandinsky's Concerning the Spiritual in Art, a faintly patronising exhortation to suffragettes not to destroy works of art, a review of a London exhibition of Expressionist woodcuts, and a last dig at Marinetti by Wyndham Lewis:

Futurism, as preached by Marinetti, is largely Impressionism up-to-date. To this is added his Automobilism and Nietzsche stunt. With a lot of good sense and vitality at his disposal, he hammers away in the blatant mechanism of his Manifestos, at his idee fixe of Modernity.

=== The Manifesto ===
The first section of Wyndham Lewis' Manifesto, Blast 1, 1914

The manifesto is primarily a long list of things to be 'Blessed' or 'Blasted'. It starts:

1. Beyond Action and Reaction we would establish ourselves.
2. We start from opposite statements of a chosen world. Set up violent structure of adolescent clearness between two extremes.
3. We discharge ourselves on both sides.
4. We fight first on one side, then on the other, but always for the SAME cause, which is neither side or both sides and ours.
5. Mercenaries were always the best troops.
6. We are primitive Mercenaries in the Modern World.
7. Our Cause is NO-MAN'S.
8. We set Humour at Humour's throat. Stir up Civil War among peaceful apes.
9. We only want Humour if it has fought like Tragedy.
10. We only want Tragedy if it can clench its side-muscles like hands on its belly, and bring to the surface a laugh like a bomb.

The subjects either 'Blasted' or 'Blessed' depended on how they were seen by the fledgling Vorticists. Among them were the leaders of the rival avant-garde grouped about Roger Fry and the Bloomsbury set, as well as the literary leaders of the past. Thus the "Purgatory of Putney" is named for being the place to which Algernon Swinburne had retired into respectability. Among the Blessed are seafarers because "they exchange...one element for another" (p. 22) and the hairdresser who "attacks Mother Nature for a small fee....[and] trims aimless and retrograde growths" (p. 25). Henry Tonks, the Slade Professor of Fine Art, had the unique honour of being both 'Blessed' and 'Blasted'.

The first edition also contained many illustrations in the Vorticist style by Jacob Epstein, Edward Wadsworth, Lewis and others.

The English press was unimpressed by Blast, finding the literary contributions dull, and the artwork and typography a pale imitation of the Futurist style. Writing to Harold Monroe, Marinetti said he took the negative reviews as a “victory” for Futurism, but regretted there hadn’t been instead a collaboration with the Vorticists in the fight against “our great common enemy: attachment to the past."

The second edition, published on 20 July 1915, contained a short play by Ezra Pound and T. S. Eliot's poems Preludes and Rhapsody on a Windy Night. Another article by Gaudier-Brzeska entitled Vortex (written from the Trenches) further described the vorticist aesthetic. It was written whilst Gaudier-Brzeska was fighting in the First World War, a few weeks before he was killed there.

== World War I and the end of Vorticism ==
Thirty-three days after Blast 1 was published, war was declared on Germany. The First World War would destroy vorticism; both Gaudier-Brzeska and T. E. Hulme were killed at the front, and Bomberg lost his faith in modernism. Lewis was mobilised in 1916, initially fighting in France as an artillery officer, later working as a war artist for the Canadian Government. He tried to re-invigorate the avant-garde after the war, writing to a friend that he intended to publish a third edition of Blast in November 1919. He organised an exhibition of avant-garde artists called Group X at Heal's Gallery in March–April 1920, and later published a new magazine, The Tyro, of which only two issues appeared. The further issue of Blast failed to appear, and neither of the other two ventures managed to achieve the momentum of his pre-war efforts. Richard Cork writes:

When Lewis returned from the trenches, he hoped to revivify the Vorticist spirit, planning a third issue of Blast and regaining contact with old allies. But the whole context of pre-war experimentation had been dispersed by the destructive power of mechanized warfare, which persuaded most of the former Vorticists to pursue more representational directions thereafter. By 1920 even Lewis was obliged to admit that the movement was dead.

== Public collections ==
Both editions have been reprinted a number of times and are shortly to be made available again by Thames and Hudson; original copies are in the collections of the Victoria and Albert Museum, Tate, Yale University, Wake Forest University, University of Delaware, Chelsea College, University of Exeter Special Collections and others. The Fundación Juan March launched an exhibition in Madrid (from 10 Feb 2010 through 16 May 2010), Wyndham Lewis (1882–1957), publishing a semi-facsimile edition (translated into Spanish) of Blast No.1 and an edition of Timon of Athens. The Nasher Museum of Art at Duke University held an exhibition entitled The Vorticists: Rebel Artists in London and New York, 1914–18 from 30 September 2010, through 2 January 2011.

== Facsimile editions ==
- 1982. Santa Rosa: Black Sparrow Press. ISBN 978-0-87685-521-8.
- 2009. London: Thames & Hudson. ISBN 978-0-500-28782-8.
- 2010. Madrid: Fundación Juan March. ISBN 978-84-7075-573-6. With texts by Kevin Power and Paul Edwards. Translated into Spanish and annotated by Yolanda Morató.
