= Lawrence Atkinson =

English artist, musician and poet

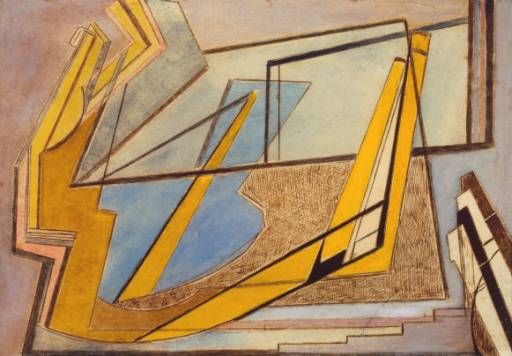
Lawrence Atkinson, The Lake, Pen and watercolor on paper, circa 1915-1920

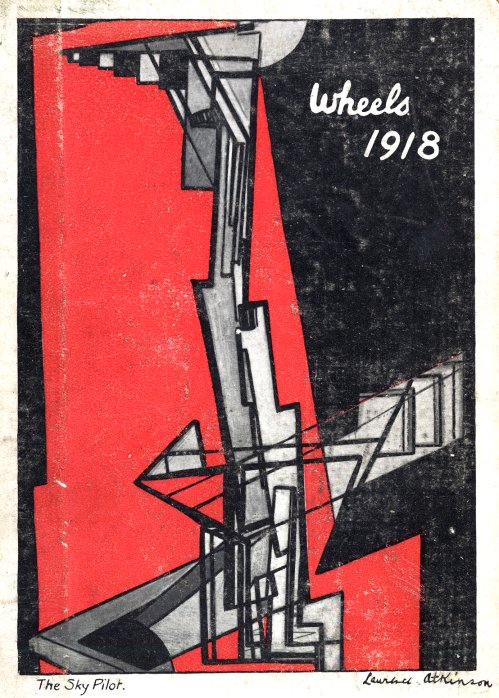
Sky Pilot by Lawrence Atkinson for the cover of Wheels, 1918.

Lawrence Atkinson (1873–1931) was an English artist, musician and poet.

== Early life ==
Atkinson was born at Chorlton upon Medlock, near Manchester, on 17 January 1873. He began by moving to Paris and studying musical composition, but moved back to London and began to paint, apparently painting mainly landscapes in a style influenced by Matisse and the Fauves (almost all of these works are lost).

== Vorticism ==
His style changed radically when he was introduced to the work of Wyndham Lewis and the vorticists. He also wrote poetry, in a Modernist style.

== Death ==
Atkinson died in Paris on 21 September 1931.
