= Vorticism =

British modernist art movement formed in 1914

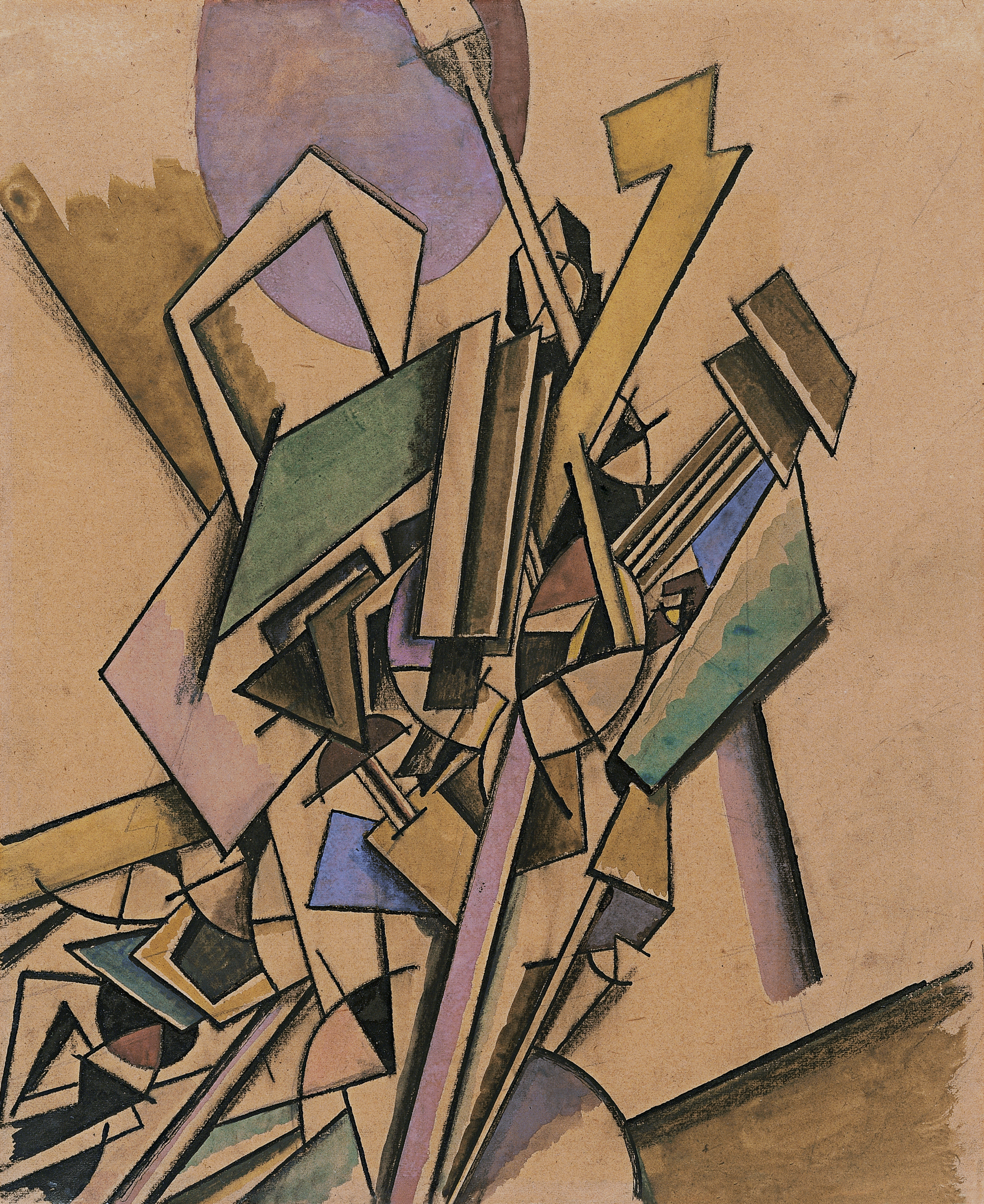
Edward Wadsworth, Vorticist Study, 1914, Museo Thyssen-Bornemisza, Madrid

Vorticism was a London-based modernist art movement formed in 1914 by the writer and artist Wyndham Lewis. The movement was partially inspired by Cubism and was introduced to the public by means of the publication of the Vorticist manifesto in Blast magazine. Familiar forms of representational art were rejected in favour of a geometric style that tended towards a hard-edged abstraction. Lewis proved unable to harness the talents of his disparate group of avant-garde artists; however, for a brief period Vorticism proved to be an exciting intervention and an artistic riposte to Marinetti's Futurism and the Post-Impressionism of Roger Fry's Omega Workshops.

Vorticist paintings emphasised 'modern life' as an array of bold lines and harsh colours drawing the viewer's eye into the centre of the canvas and vorticist sculpture created energy and intensity through 'direct carving'.

== Prelude to Vorticism ==
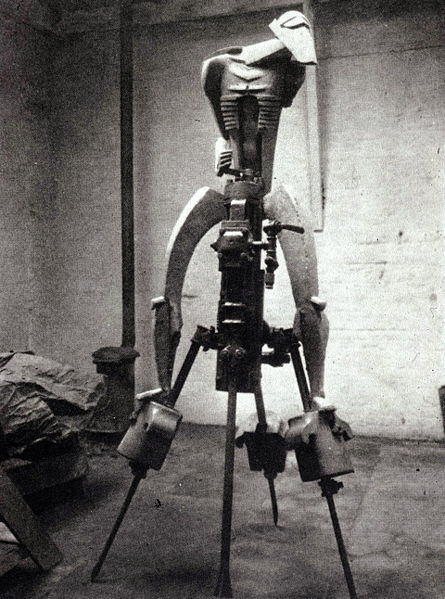
Rock Drill in Jacob Epstein's studio c.1913

The Dancers Wyndham Lewis, 1912

In the summer of 1913 Roger Fry, with Duncan Grant and Vanessa Bell, set up the Omega Workshops in Fitzrovia – in the heart of bohemian London. Fry was an advocate of an increasingly abstract art and design practice, and the studio/gallery/retail outlet allowed him to employ and support artists in sympathy with this approach, such as Wyndham Lewis, Frederick Etchells, Cuthbert Hamilton and Edward Wadsworth. Lewis had made an impact at the Allied Artists' Salon the previous year with a huge virtually abstract work, Kermesse (now lost), and in the same year he had worked with the American sculptor Jacob Epstein on the decoration of Madame Strindberg's notorious cabaret theatre club The Cave of the Golden Calf.

Lewis and his Omega Workshop colleagues Etchells, Hamilton and Wadsworth exhibited together later in the year at Brighton with Epstein and David Bomberg. Lewis curated the exhibition's 'Cubist Room' and provided a written introduction in which he attempted to cohere the various strands of abstraction on display: 'These painters are not accidently [sic?] associated here, but form a vertiginous, but not exotic, island in the placid and respectable archipelago of English Art.'

== Rebel artists ==
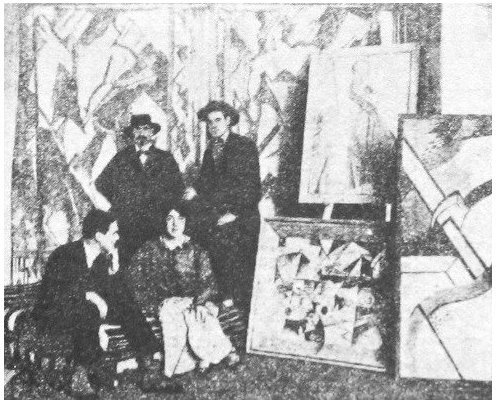
Kate Lechmere, Cuthbert Hamilton (seated), Edward Wadsworth and Wyndham Lewis at the Rebel Art Centre, March 1914

A quarrel with Roger Fry provided Lewis with a pretext to leave the Omega Workshops and set up a rival organisation. Financed by Lewis's painter friend Kate Lechmere, the Rebel Art Centre was established in March 1914 at 38 Great Ormond Street. It was to be a platform for the art and ideas of Lewis's circle, and a lecture series included talks by Lewis's friend the poet Ezra Pound, the novelist Ford Madox Hueffer (later Ford Madox Ford) and the Italian 'Futurist', Filippo Tommaso Marinetti. Marinetti had been a familiar – and provocative – presence in London since 1910, and Lewis had seen him create an art movement on the basis of his 'Futurist' manifesto. It seemed as if everything novel or shocking in London was now being described as 'Futurist' – including the work of the English Cubists.

When Marinetti and the English Futurist C. R. W. Nevinson published a manifesto of 'Vital English Art', giving the Rebel Art Centre as an address, it seemed like an attempted takeover. A few weeks later, Lewis took out an advertisement in The Spectator to announce the publication of 'The Manifesto of the Vorticists' – an English abstract art movement that was a 'parallel movement to Cubism and Expressionism' and would, the advertisement promised, be a 'Death Blow to Impressionism and Futurism'.

== Inventing Vorticism ==
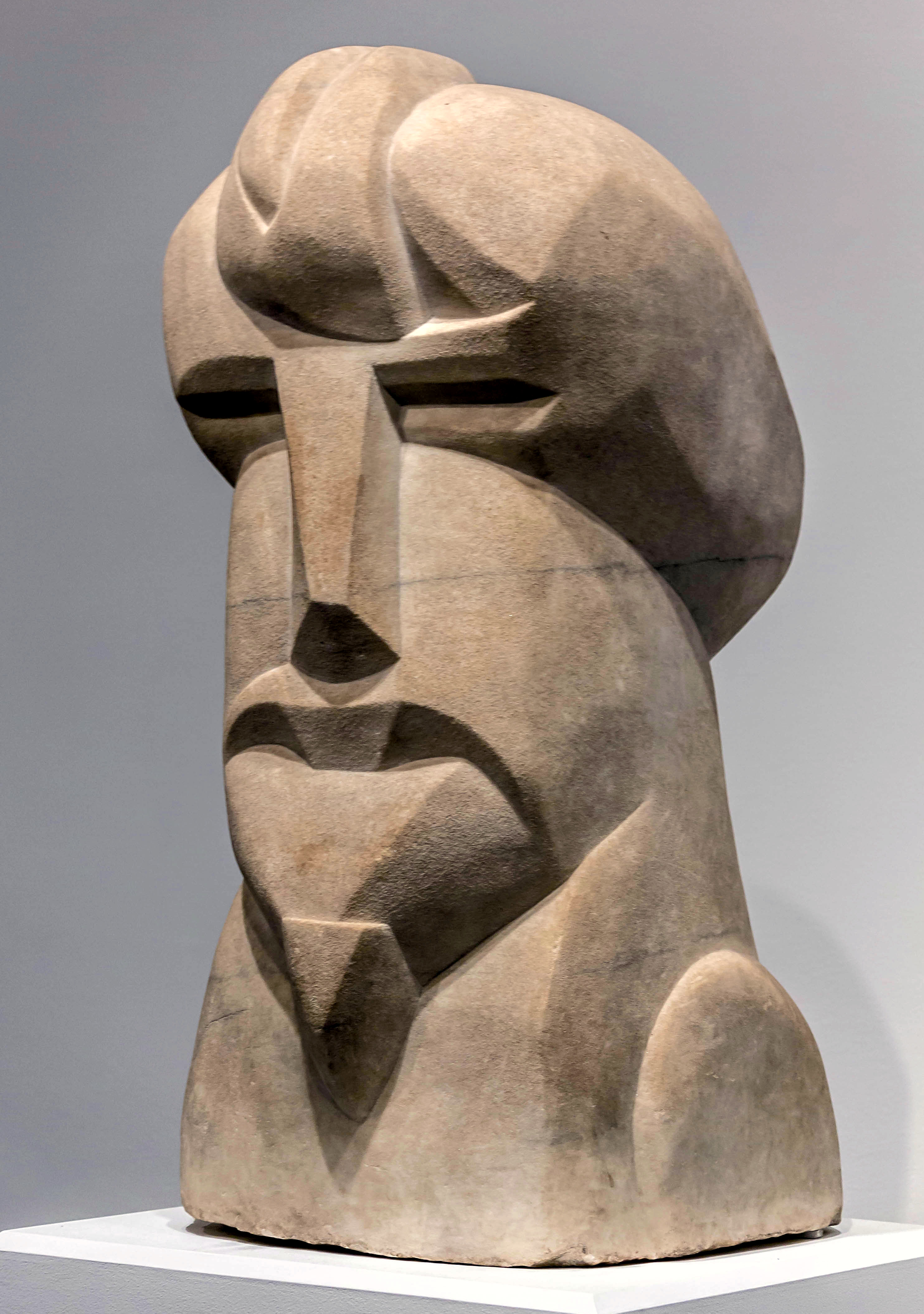
Hieratic Head of Ezra Pound by Henri Gaudier-Brzeska, 1914

Workshop Wyndham Lewis, c.1914

Ezra Pound had introduced the concept of 'the vortex' in relation to modernist poetry and art early on in 1914. At its most obvious, for example, London could be seen to be a 'vortex' of intellectual and artistic activity. However, for Pound there was a more specific – if obscure – meaning: '[The vortex was] that point in the cyclone where energy cuts into space and imparts form to it ... the pattern of angles and geometric lines which is formed by our vortex in the existing chaos.' Lewis saw the potential of 'Vorticism' as an exciting rallying call that was also sufficiently vague, he hoped, to embrace the individualism of the rebel artists.

Lewis's Vorticist manifesto was to be published in a new literary and art journal, BLAST – ironically, the journal's title had been suggested by Nevinson, who was now persona non grata since the 'Vital English Art' manifesto. The French sculptor, painter and anarchist Henri Gaudier-Brzeska had met Ezra Pound in July 1913, and their ideas on 'The New Sculpture' developed into a theory of Vorticist sculpture. Two artists, Helen Saunders and Jessica Dismorr, who had turned to 'cubist works' in 1913, joined the rebels – and, although they were not regarded highly by the men, Brigid Peppin argues that Saunders's 'juxtapositions of strong and unexpected colour' may have influenced Lewis's later use of forceful colour.

Another up-and-coming 'English Cubist' using bold, discordant colour combinations was William Roberts. Writing much later, he recalled Lewis borrowing two paintings – Religion and Dancers – to hang at the Rebel Art Centre.

== BLAST ==
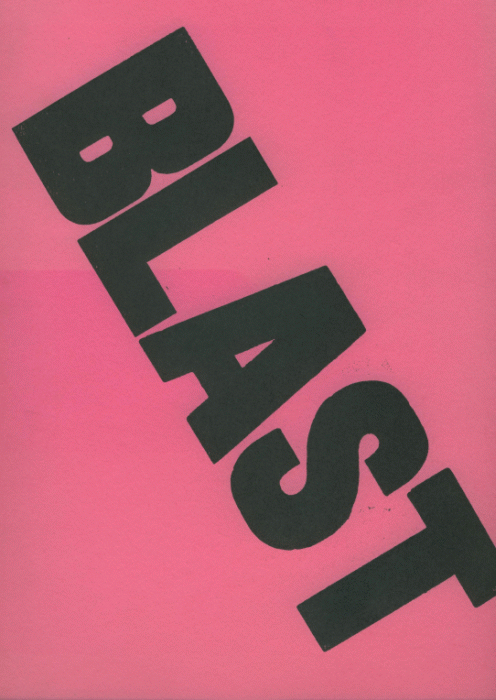
BLAST: The Review of the Great English Vortex,1914

Although the Rebel Art Centre was short-lived, 'Vorticism' was given assured longevity through the dazzling typography and the audacious (and humorous) 'blasting' and 'blessing' of myriad sacred cows of English and American culture that appeared in the first issue of BLAST: The Review of the Great English Vortex, published in July 1914.

David Bomberg, The Mud Bath, 1914, Tate

BLAST was launched at a 'riotous celebratory dinner' at the Dieudonné Hotel in the St James's area of London on 15 July 1914. The magazine was mainly the work of Lewis, but also included extensive written pieces by Ford Madox Hueffer and Rebecca West, as well as poetry by Pound, articles by Gaudier-Brzeska and Wadsworth, and reproductions of paintings by Lewis, Wadsworth, Etchells, Roberts, Epstein, Gaudier-Brzeska and Hamilton. The manifesto was apparently 'signed' by eleven signatories. Lewis, Pound and Gaudier-Brzeska were at the intellectual heart of the project, but Roberts's later comments suggest that most of the group were not made aware of the manifesto's contents before publication. Jacob Epstein was presumably too established to be co-opted as a signatory, and David Bomberg had threatened Lewis with legal action if his work was reproduced in BLAST and made his independence very clear through a one-man show at the Chenil Galleries, also in July, where his large abstract painting Mud Bath was prominently displayed outside above the entrance.

== Vorticist Exhibition ==
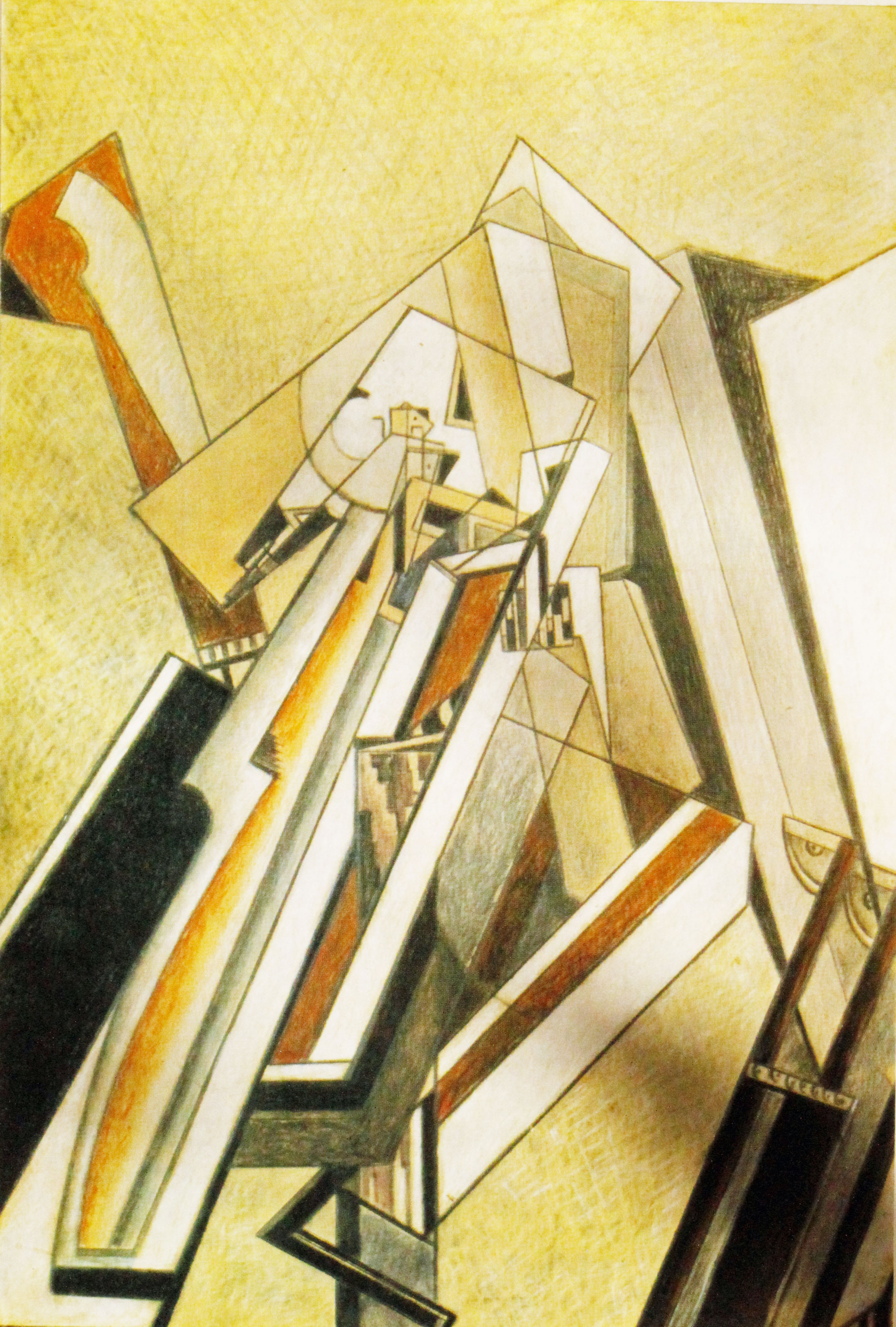
Abstract Composition is indicative of Laurence Atkinson's work at the time of the Vorticist Exhibition, 1915

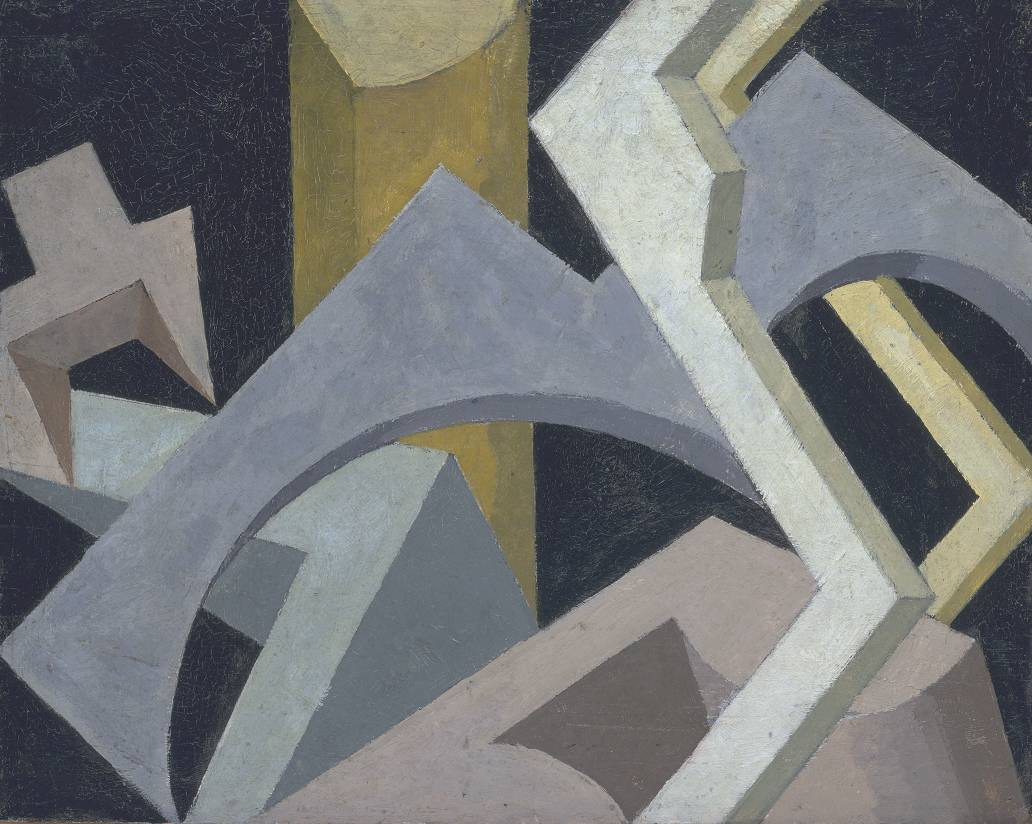
Abstract Composition is indicative of Jessica Dismorr's work at the time of the Vorticist Exhibition, 1915

The publication of BLAST could not have come at a worse time, as in August 1914 Britain declared war on Germany. There would be little appetite for avant-garde art at this time of national and international crisis; however, a 'Vorticist Exhibition' went ahead at the Doré Galleries in New Bond Street the following year. The forty-nine 'Vorticist' works by Dismorr, Etchells, Gaudier-Brzeska, Lewis, Roberts, Saunders and Wadsworth showed a commitment to hard-edged, highly coloured, near-abstract work. Perhaps by way of contrast (or comparison), Lewis also invited other artists including Bomberg and Nevinson to participate.

A catalogue foreword by Lewis clarified that 'by Vorticism we mean (a) ACTIVITY as opposed to the tasteful PASSIVITY of Picasso (b) SIGNIFICANCE as opposed to the dull anecdotal character to which the Naturalist is condemned (c) ESSENTIAL MOVEMENT and ACTIVITY (such as the energy of the mind) as opposed to the imitative cinematography, the fuss and hysterics of the Futurists.' The exhibition was largely ignored by the press, and the reviews that did appear were damning.

== BLAST: War Number ==
Just before the exhibition opening, news reached London of Gaudier-Brzeska's death in the trenches in France. A 'Notice to Public' in the second number of BLAST explained that the publication had been delayed 'due to the War chiefly' and to 'the illness of the Editor at the time it should have appeared and before', and the delay allowed the last-minute inclusion of a tribute to the artist.

Compared with BLAST No. 1 this was a scaled-back production – 102 pages, rather than the 158 pages of the first issue and with simple black-and-white 'line block' illustrations. However, compared with BLAST No. 1, that did have the advantage of providing 'a cohesive Vorticist aesthetic'. Jessica Dismorr and Dorothy Shakespear (Ezra Pound's wife) joined a slightly broader range of artists that also included Jacob Kramer and Nevinson. Lewis's rhetoric was more cautious this time – trying to avoid being seen by the readership as unpatriotic. Understandably, he tried to strike an optimist tone with regard to the future of Vorticism and BLAST; however, within a year most of the artists had enlisted or volunteered in the armed forces: Lewis – Royal Garrison Artillery; Roberts – Royal Field Artillery; Wadsworth – British Naval Intelligence; Bomberg – Royal Engineers; Dismorr – Voluntary Air Detachment; and Saunders – government office work.

== Vorticists at the Penguin Club ==
Ezra Pound had been championing Wyndham Lewis's work from 1915 with a successful New York lawyer and art collector, John Quinn. Relying on Pound's recommendations, a New York Vorticist exhibition was built around forty-six works by Lewis – some already in Quinn's collection – with additional work by Etchells, Roberts, Dismorr, Saunders and Wadsworth. The exhibition was to be at an artist-run establishment, the Penguin Club in New York. Pound arranged for the transportation of works across the Atlantic, and Quinn took on the entire exhibition costs. Quinn had already selected works that he was interested in buying, but after the exhibition, as no works had sold, he eventually purchased most of the larger items.

== War artists ==
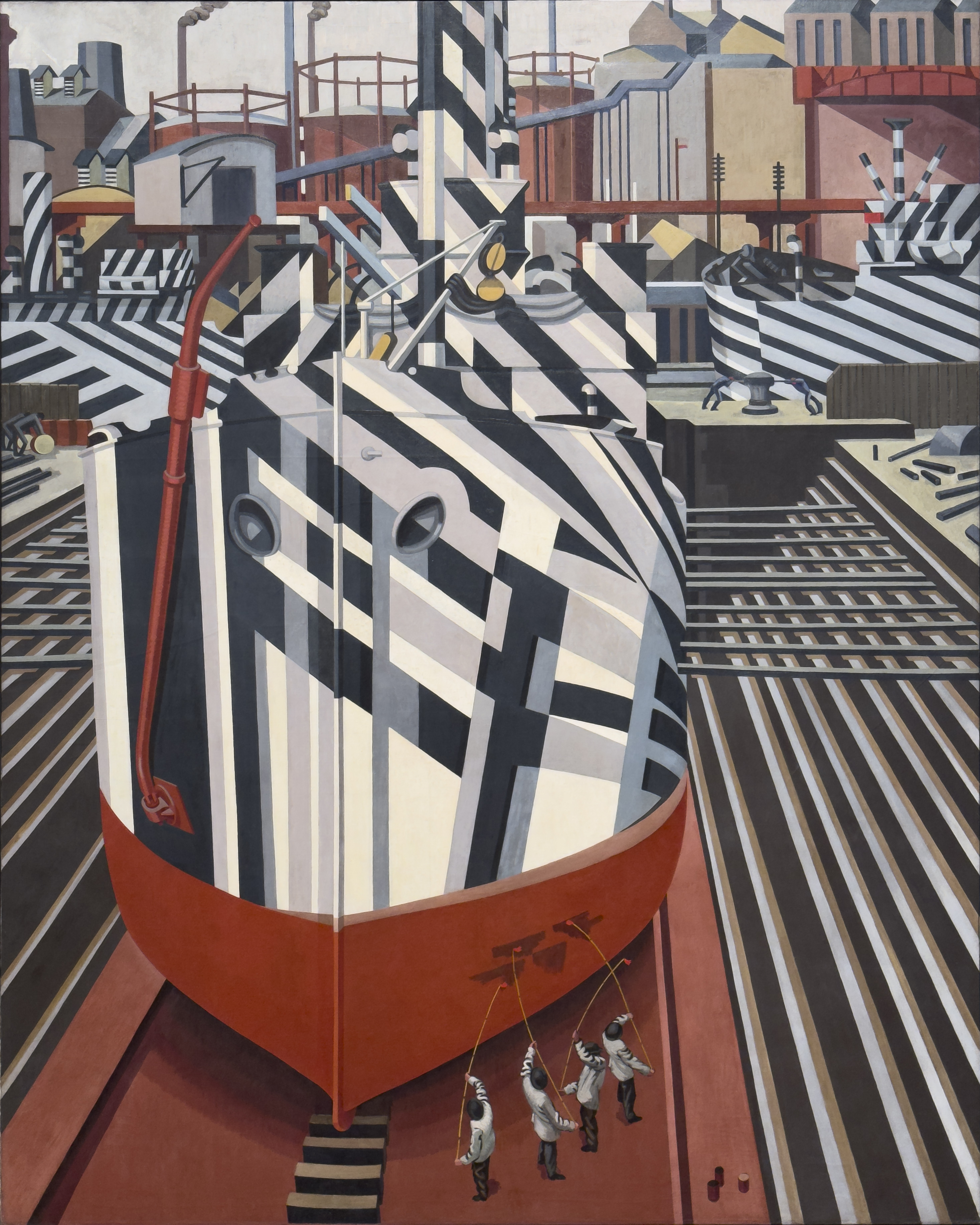
Dazzle-Ships in Drydock at Liverpool by Edward Wadsworth, 1919, National Gallery of Canada, Ottawa

There was almost no opportunity for the rebel artists to work creatively while on active service. However, Wadsworth, unexpectedly, was able to pursue his artistic interests through the supervision of the dazzle camouflage being applied to over two thousand ships, largely at Bristol and Liverpool.

Towards the end of the war the journalist Paul Konody, now art adviser to the Canadian War Memorials Fund (and someone who had been blatantly anti-Vorticism), commissioned Lewis, Wadsworth, Nevinson, Roberts, Paul Nash and Bomberg to produce monumental canvases on subjects relating to the Canadian war experience for a projected memorial hall in Ottawa. The artists were warned that only 'representative' work would be acceptable, and indeed Bomberg's first version of his Sappers at Work was rejected as being 'too cubist'. Despite these restrictions, the extraordinary canvases feel uncompromisingly modernist, and certainly drew from pre-war avant-garde practices.

== Group X ==
Poster for the Group X exhibition, 1920

In the post-war years it was difficult for artists to receive patronage and to secure sales. Nevertheless, Lewis, Wadsworth, Roberts and Atkinson all had one-man shows by the early 1920s – each artist navigating his own path between modernism and potentially more saleable recognisable subjects. Lewis organised one more group show, in 1920 at the Mansard Gallery, bringing together ten artists under the banner 'Group X'. Now, however, there was little attempt to unify the artists's contributions beyond Lewis's belief that 'the experiments [by artists] undertaken all over Europe during the last ten years should .... not be lightly abandoned.' The diversity of styles on display, for example, included four self-portraits by Lewis, while Roberts exhibited four quite radical works in his evolving 'Cubist' style. Six of the Group X artists had been in the 'Vorticist' group – Dismorr, Etchells, Hamilton, Lewis, Roberts and Wadsworth – and they were joined by the sculptor Frank Dobson (sculptor), the painter Charles Ginner, the American graphic designer Edward McKnight Kauffer, and the painter John Turnbull. The exhibition was mainly seen as a failure to 'rekindle a flame of adventure'.

== Legacy ==
The disruption of war and the subsequent mobilisation of the artists contributed to a situation whereby many of the larger Vorticist paintings were lost. An anecdote recorded by Brigid Peppin relates how Helen Saunders's sister used a Vorticist oil to cover her larder floor and '[it was] worn to destruction' – an extreme example of how the paintings were not appreciated. When John Quinn died, in 1927, his collection of Vorticist works was auctioned and dissipated to now untraceable purchasers, presumably in America. Writing in 1974, Richard Cork noted that 'thirty-eight of the forty-nine works displayed by the full members of the movement at the 1915 Vorticist Exhibition are now missing.'

Despite a resurgence of abstract art in Britain in the middle years of the twentieth century, the contribution of Vorticism was largely forgotten until a spat between John Rothenstein of the Tate Gallery and William Roberts blew up in the press. Rothenstein's 1956 Tate Gallery exhibition 'Wyndham Lewis and Vorticism' was actually a Lewis retrospective with very few Vorticist works. And the inclusion of work by Bomberg, Roberts, Wadsworth, Nevinson, Dobson, Kramer under the heading 'Other Vorticists' – together with Lewis's assertion that 'Vorticism, in fact, was what I, personally, did, and said, at a certain period' – incensed Roberts as it seemed that he and the others were being set up to be mere disciples of Lewis. The case made by Roberts in the five 'Vorticist Pamphlets' that he published between 1956 and 1958 was hampered by the absence of key works, but led to other self-published books by Roberts which included early studies of his abstract work. A broader survey was provided by the d'Offay Couper Gallery's 'Abstract Art in England 1913–1914' exhibition in 1969.

Five years later, the exhibition 'Vorticism and Its Allies' curated by Richard Cork at the Hayward Gallery, London, went further in painstakingly bringing together paintings, drawings, sculpture (including a reconstruction of Epstein's Rock Drill 1913–15), Omega Workshop artefacts, photographs, journals, catalogues, letters and cartoons. Cork also included twenty-five 'Vortographs' from 1917 by the photographer Alvin Langdon Coburn that had been first displayed at the Camera Club in London in 1918.

== Recent exhibitions ==
More recently, in 2004 in London and Manchester, 'Blasting the Future!: Vorticism in Britain 1910–1920' explored the links between Vorticism and Futurism, and a major exhibition 'The Vorticists: Manifesto for a Modern World' in 2010–11 brought Vorticist work to Italy for the first time and to America for the first time since 1917, as well as appearing in London. The curators, Mark Antliff and Vivien Greene, had also traced some previously lost works (such as three paintings by Helen Saunders) that were included in the exhibition.
