= 1997 Laurence Olivier Awards =

Edition of London theatre awards

The 1997 Laurence Olivier Awards were held in 1997 in London celebrating excellence in West End theatre by the Society of London Theatre.

== Winners and nominees ==
Details of winners (in bold) and nominees, in each award category, per the Society of London Theatre.

Play of the Year	Best New Musical
**Stanley by Pam Gems – National Theatre Cottesloe**; Blinded by the Sun by Stephen Poliakoff – National Theatre Cottesloe; The Beauty Queen of Leenane by Martin McDonagh – Royal Court; The Herbal Bed by Peter Whelan – RSC at the Barbican Pit	**Martin Guerre – Prince Edward**; Nine – Donmar Warehouse; Passion – Queen's
Best Comedy	Outstanding Musical Production
**Art by Yasmina Reza – Wyndham's**; Laughter on the 23rd Floor by Neil Simon – Queen's; The Complete Works of William Shakespeare (Abridged) by Adam Long, Daniel Singer and Jess Winfield – Criterion	**Tommy – Shaftesbury**; By Jeeves – Duke of York's / Lyric; Jesus Christ Superstar – Lyceum; Smokey Joe's Cafe – Prince of Wales
Best Actor	Best Actress
**Antony Sher as Stanley Spencer in Stanley – National Theatre Cottesloe**; Paul Scofield as John Gabriel Borkman in John Gabriel Borkman – National Theatre Lyttelton; Ken Stott as Yvan in Art – Wyndham's; David Suchet as George in Who's Afraid of Virginia Woolf – Aldwych	**Janet McTeer as Nora Helmer in A Doll's House – Playhouse**; Eileen Atkins as Mrs. Gunhild Borkman in John Gabriel Borkman – National Theatre Lyttelton; Vanessa Redgrave as Ella Rentheim in John Gabriel Borkman – National Theatre Lyttelton; Diana Rigg as Martha in Who's Afraid of Virginia Woolf – Aldwych
Best Actor in a Musical	Best Actress in a Musical
**Robert Lindsay as Fagin in Oliver – London Palladium**; Iain Glen as Martin Guerre in Martin Guerre – Prince Edward; Paul Keating as Tommy in Tommy – Shaftesbury; Steven Pacey as Bertie Wooster in By Jeeves – Duke of York's / Lyric	**Maria Friedman as Fosca in Passion – Queen's**; B.J. Crosby as Performer in Smokey Joe's Cafe – Prince of Wales; Joanna Riding as Sarah Brown in Guys and Dolls – National Theatre Olivier; Imelda Staunton as Miss Adelaide in Guys and Dolls – National Theatre Olivier
Best Actor in a Supporting Role	Best Actress in a Supporting Role
**Trevor Eve as Dr. Mikhail Lvovich Astrov in Uncle Vanya – Albery**; Stephen Boxer as Barnabus Goche in The Herbal Bed – RSC at the Barbican Pit; Tony Haygarth as Juror #3 in Twelve Angry Men – Comedy; Owen Teale as Torvald Helmer in A Doll's House – Playhouse	**Deborah Findlay as Hilda Carline in Stanley – National Theatre Cottesloe**; Frances Barber as Sonya Alexandrovna Serebryakova in Uncle Vanya – Albery; Anna Chancellor as Patricia Preece in Stanley – National Theatre Cottesloe; Clare Holman as Honey in Who's Afraid of Virginia Woolf – Aldwych
Best Supporting Performance in a Musical
**Clive Rowe as Nicely Nicely Johnson in Guys and Dolls – National Theatre Olivier**; James Gillan as pinball lad in Tommy – Shaftesbury; Hugh Ross as Dr. Tambourri in Passion – Queen's; Tony Selby as Ben Rumson in Paint Your Wagon – Open Air
Best Director	Best Theatre Choreographer
**Des McAnuff for Tommy – Shaftesbury**; Richard Eyre for John Gabriel Borkman – National Theatre Lyttelton; Anthony Page for A Doll's House – Playhouse; Matthew Warchus for Art – Wyndham's	**Bob Avian for Martin Guerre – Prince Edward**; Wayne Cilento for Tommy – Shaftesbury
Best Set Designer	Best Costume Designer
**Tim Hatley for Stanley – National Theatre Cottesloe**; John Arnone for Tommy – Shaftesbury; Paul Farnsworth for Passion – Queen's; Mark Thompson for Art – Wyndham's	**Tim Goodchild for The Relapse – RSC at the Barbican Pit**; Louise Belson for By Jeeves – Duke of York's / Lyric; William Dudley for Mary Stuart – National Theatre Lyttelton; David C. Woolard for Tommy – Shaftesbury
Best Lighting Designer
**Chris Parry for Tommy – Shaftesbury**; Mark Henderson for John Gabriel Borkman – National Theatre Lyttelton; David Hersey for Martin Guerre – Prince Edward; Hugh Vanstone for Art – Wyndham's
Outstanding Achievement in Dance	Best New Dance Production
**The dancers of Rambert Dance Company for their season at the London Coliseum**; Sue Blane for her designs of Alice in Wonderland, English National Ballet – London Coliseum; Viviana Durante in Anastasia... Now Langourous, Now Wild..., The Royal Ballet – Royal Opera House; Thomas Edur in Alice in Wonderland and Giselle – London Coliseum	**Cinderella, English National Ballet – London Coliseum**; Alice in Wonderland, English National Ballet – London Coliseum; Carmina Burana, Birmingham Royal Ballet – Royal Opera House
Outstanding Achievement in Opera	Outstanding New Opera Production
**Elgar Howarth for conducting Die Soldaten and The Prince of Homburg, English National Opera – London Coliseum**; Wolfgang Gobbel for light designing of The Midsummer Marriage, The Royal Opera – Royal Opera House and Tristan und Isolde, English National Opera – London Coliseum; Karita Mattila in Don Carlos, The Royal Opera – Royal Opera House	**Tristan und Isolde, English National Opera – London Coliseum**; Cavalleria rusticana and I Pagliacci, Welsh National Opera – Royal Opera House; Fidelio, English National Opera – London Coliseum
Society Special Award
**Margaret Harris**

== Productions with multiple nominations and awards ==
The following 16 productions, including one ballet and one opera, received multiple nominations:

- 8: Tommy
- 5: Art, John Gabriel Borkman and Stanley
- 4: Martin Guerre and Passion
- 3: A Doll's House, Alice in Wonderland, By Jeeves, Guys and Dolls and Who's Afraid of Virginia Woolf
- 2: Alice in Wonderland, Smokey Joe's Cafe, The Herbal Bed, Tristan und Isolde and Uncle Vanya

The following three productions received multiple awards:

- 4: Stanley
- 3: Tommy
- 2: Martin Guerre

== See also ==
- 51st Tony Awards
