= Double Nude Portrait: The Artist and his Second Wife 1937 =

Painting by Stanley Spencer

Double Nude Portrait: The Artist and his Second Wife 1937 (also known as the Leg of mutton nude portrait) is an oil on canvas painting by British artist Stanley Spencer. It depicts Spencer and his soon-to-be second wife, Patricia Preece, beside a raw leg of lamb. The painting is sexually charged: Spencer's second wife was a lesbian in a long-term relationship when they married, and their marriage was never consummated. The painting is held by the Tate Gallery, which describes it as "probably now Spencer's most famous picture".

The painting is one of seven portraits that Spencer painted of his wives between 1933 and 1937, all nude or semi-nude: one of his first wife, Hilda Carline; four of his second wife, Patricia Preece; and two double portraits of Spencer and Preece together. Unusually for Spencer, who usually painted portraits from memory, these seven were painted from life.

Spencer and Preece are depicted naked, painted in an explicitly realist style, with close attention to the tones and textures of the skin of the subjects. Spencer squats at the rear of the painting, naked but for his spectacles, looking down pensively at Preece. Preece reclines across the painting, with her arms behind her head and legs spread. Both bodies are only partially visible, cut off by the frame. Beside Preece, in the foreground, sit a raw leg of lamb and a lamb chop – which Spencer described as "the uncooked supper" – with a Valor oil heater in the background. The uncooked meat may be representative of Spencer's unconsummated relationship with Preece.

The large work, 83.8 centimetres (33.0 in) by 93.7 centimetres (36.9 in), was painted at Lindhurst, Spencer's house at Cookham, which he occupied from 1932 to 1938. It was bought by the Tate Gallery in 1974.

Copyright restrictions mean that the painting cannot be reproduced; however, it features in "Stanley and His Daughters", a 2017 BBC Arena documentary about Spencer, his wife Hilda and their daughters, Shirin and Unity.
