= Annie Carline =

British artist

- Born: Annie Smith; 15 October 1862; Buckhurst Hill, Essex, England
- Died: 20 October 1945 (aged 83)
- Known for: Painting
- Spouse: George Francis Carline

Annie Carline née Annie Smith (15 October 1862 – 20 October 1945) was a British artist.

== Biography ==
Carline was born at Buckhurst Hill in Essex and was adopted at birth by relatives and never knew her biological parents. She was working as a housemaid when she met the artist George Francis Carline who had been commissioned to paint a portrait in the area. In less than a year they were married and living in London where they remained until 1892. Over the following years they lived in Oxford, spent a year in Switzerland, four years in Derbyshire and finally settled in Hampstead in north London in 1916. The couple had had five children of whom three, Richard, Sydney and Hilda, all become artists. The family home, first at Downshire Hill and later on Pond Street was full of art and often visiting artists and writers. These included. among others Henry Lamb, Stanley Spencer, Mark Gertler and John Nash. An annual family painting holiday became a regular feature and it was on one such trip, to Assisi in 1920, that George Carline died suddenly. Encouraged by the artists she had met through her children and husband, Annie Carline took up painting. From 1927 she produced landscapes and figures, usually in watercolour. She exhibited with the London Group and the Artists' International Association. The cubist painter André Lhote helped organise a solo exhibition of her work at the Galerie Pittoresque in Paris. Carline remained active as a painter until her death in 1945.
