= Nancy Carline =

English painter (1909–2004)

- Born: 30 November 1909; London, England
- Died: 18 October 2004 (aged 94); Wallingford, Oxfordshire, England
- Education: Slade School of Fine Art
- Known for: Painting
- Spouse: Richard Carline

Nancy Mona Carline (née Higgins, 30 November 1909 – 18 October 2004) was a British artist who painted landscapes with figures, portraits, biblical and classical subjects plus groups of figures in domestic settings. She studied at the Slade School of Art and worked at the Sadlers Wells Ballet and later attended the stage design course at the Slade run by Vladimir Polunin. In 1950 she married the artist Richard Carline, which placed her at the centre of an artistic circle centred on the Carline family in Hampstead.

== Biography ==
Carline was born in London, to a British father and an Australian mother. Her father, Douglas Higgins, was the co-founder of the Jones & Higgins store in Peckham. After he was killed at the Battle of Passchendaele, Nancy and her three siblings were raised by their mother, Mona, in a large house containing the art and antiques that he had collected throughout his life. After attending Wycombe Abbey School, Carline enrolled at the Slade School of Art in 1928 where she was taught by Henry Tonks, Philip Wilson Steer and, from 1930, Allan Gwynne-Jones, who became a lifelong friend to her. For two seasons, from 1933, Carline worked, on an unpaid basis, in the costume department at the Sadlers wells ballet. Among the artists working there was Vladimir and Elizabeth Polunin who were producing and designing opera and ballet sets for the company. Vladimir Polunin encouraged her to take the course he was teaching in stage design at the Slade and Carline returned to the art school. There, in 1934, she met Richard Carline, whom she eventually married in 1950. Richard Carline was the youngest of the five children born to the artist George Francis Carline and Anne Smith (1862–1945). His brother, Sydney Carline and his sister Hilda Carline were also artists, as was his brother-in-law, Stanley Spencer. Other artists who were regularly at the Carline family home in Hampstead included Henry Lamb, Paul Nash, John Nash, Gilbert Spencer and Mark Gertler. Nancy Carline's 1946 painting Supper on the Terrace shows the Carline family of artists at their Pond Street home in Hampstead.

In the late 1930s both Nancy and Richard Carline were active in helping refugees from Nazi Germany settle in London. During the Second World War, she worked as an art teacher at a school in Purley, while continuing to paint. She continued to show at the New English Art Club, which had been founded in 1886 as a pro-French counter-influence to the stuffiness of the Royal Academy; but with a fine indifference to history, she showed at RA summer shows as well. Among her war-time paintings were Soho in War-time and VE Night, a depiction of the celebrations at the end of the conflict in Europe. She remained an advocate of art education throughout her life. The couple served as art examiners for the University of Cambridge Local Examinations Syndicate from 1955 to 1974 and travelled extensively in Asia and Africa in that role. They also painted in Mexico and Venice and worked together on a book, Paint they Must, on art education.

Nancy Carline exhibited regularly with the Royal Academy, the London Group during the 1930s and from 1957 to 1959, the New English Art Club, the Artists' International Association, and the Wildenstein Gallery in 1946. Carline's work featured in a number of Carline family exhibitions including The Carline Family in 1977 at the Leicester Galleries in London and The Spencers and the Carlines which toured in 1980. A retrospective of her life's work was held at the Camden Arts Centre and she was made an Honorary Life-Member of the NEAC in 1989. After Richard died in 1980, she moved from Hampsted to Oxford to be closer to her son Francis in Wallingford. She continued to paint, including seascapes painted on the Isle of Portland during summer holidays with Francis and his family. Carline died in a nursing home in Wallingford in 2004.
