= Stanley (play) =

1996 play

- Original window card
- Written by: Pam Gems
- Original language: English
- Subject: A painter wants two wives simultaneously.
- Genre: Drama
- Setting: 1920-1959; Cookham in Berkshire and Hampstead in London

Premiere
- Date premiered: 1996
- Place premiered: Cottesloe, National Theatre, London

Stanley is a 1996 play written by English playwright Pam Gems. The play premiered at the Royal National Theatre's Cottesloe Theatre in London.

== Plot synopsis ==
The play explores the complicated life of British painter Stanley Spencer, who was played by Antony Sher in the play's London and Broadway debuts.

Spencer was a twentieth-century painter whose work attempted to combine the sexual with the divine in contemporary English settings. His paintings frequently showed biblical scenes taking place in ordinary English villages, particularly Cookham, and often depicted or used figures inspired by his friends, relatives and lovers.

Spencer married two different women; he left his first wife, Hilda Carline, an artist who put her ambition aside to make a home for him, to marry Patricia Preece, a defiantly unconventional lesbian who made her reputation as an artist by passing off the works of her lover, Dorothy Hepworth, as her own, and who was incapable of loving him. Much of the play revolves around his passionate attachment to both women.

== Awards and nominations ==
Awards

- 1996 Evening Standard Award for Best Play
- 1997 Laurence Olivier Award for Best New Play
- 1997 Laurence Olivier Award for Best Actor- Antony Sher
- 1997 Laurence Olivier Award for Best Actress in a Supporting Role- Deborah Findlay
- 1997 Laurence Olivier Award for Best Set Designer- Tim Hatley

Nominations

- 1997 Tony Award for Best Play
- 1997 Tony Award for Best Actor in a Play- Antony Sher
- 1997 Tony Award for Best Direction of a Play- John Caird
- 1997 Laurence Olivier Award for Best Actress in a Supporting Role- Anna Chancellor
