= Edward Beddington-Behrens =

Sir Edward Beddington-Behrens
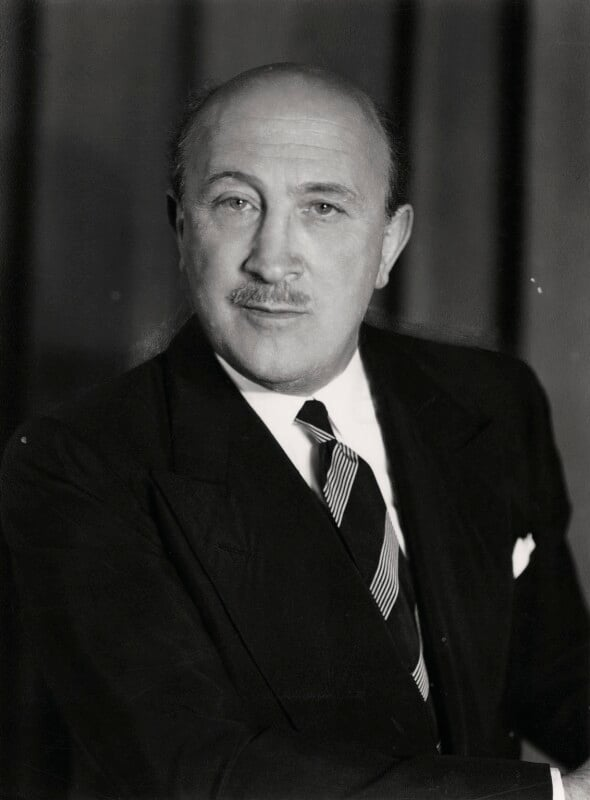
- Beddington-Behrens in 1951
- Born: 2 February 1897; Paris, France
- Died: 28 November 1968 (aged 71); London, England
- Military career
- Rank: Major
- Unit: Royal Field Artillery
- Awards: Military Cross and bar Order of St Michael and St George

Major Sir Edward Beddington-Behrens CMG MC* (2 February 1897 – 28 November 1968) was a British soldier, businessman and patron of the arts, and a leading advocate of European co-operation.

== Early life ==
Beddington-Behrens was born in Paris in 1897, where his father, Walter Behrens, was President of the British Chamber of Commerce. He was educated at Charterhouse School, and the Royal Military Academy, Woolwich.

== Career ==
In 1915, Beddington-Behrens was commissioned into the Royal Field Artillery, winning the Military Cross in 1917, with bar added in 1918. His twin brother 2nd Lt. Walter Louis Behrens, Royal Field Artillery, was killed in action in 1917.

After the war, he studied at Christ Church, Oxford and took a PhD in economics at the University of London, before becoming one of the British representatives at the League of Nations. In 1932, he published A Practical Monetary Policy for the Ottawa Conference.

When World War II broke out, Beddington-Behrens was called up from the Territorial Army, and served in Belgium prior to Dunkirk, and later as a staff officer at Coleshill House.

He pursued a successful career in business, with interests in engineering, shipping and textiles. He was Chairman of the Ocean Trust Ltd, Gray's Carpets and Textiles and Jeremiah Ambler and Sons.

In the 1953 Coronation honours, Beddington-Behrens was made a Companion of the Order of St Michael and St George, in recognition of his work on European co-operation. He served as Chairman of the British Committee of the European League for Economic Cooperation, later becoming President of the European Movement, for which he was knighted in 1957. In 1966, he published Is There Any Choice? Britain Must Join Europe.

== Patron of the arts ==
Beddington-Behrens' mother, Evelyn Beddington, was from a family of art patrons, including her sister Violet Salaman Beddington Schiff and brother-in-law, the author Sydney Schiff. Edward continued this tradition, supporting Stanley Spencer and his wife Patricia Preece. In the 1930s, Spencer and Beddington-Behrens spent time in Switzerland, in Valais and Zermatt. He was also a patron of Oscar Kokoschka, housing him and his wife Olda in Park Lane in 1943. Among his notable acquisitions were a 1965 cast of the 1913 sculpture The Dancer by Henri Gaudier-Brzeska and The Crab by Oskar Kokoschka both now in the Tate collection. He was a friend and neighbour of Max Beerbohm, who drew his portrait in 1948, and in London socialised with Charlie Chaplin.

== Marriages and children ==
Beddington-Behrens was married three times.

1. In 1931, he married Barbara Jessie Burton, daughter of Sir Montague Burton. They had a daughter. The marriage ended in divorce.
2. On 9 August 1944, he married Princess Irina Sergeevna Obolensky in the private chapel of the Russian House, Kensington. Irina was born at Luga on 14 September 1917, the daughter of Prince Sergei Alexandrovich Obolensky (1879-1960) and his wife, Liubov Alexandrovna Naryshkina (1890-1967). They had a son, Dr. Serge Obolensky Beddington-Behrens, and a daughter. They divorced in 1958.
3. In June 1958, he married Mrs Irene Adela Kane (1906–1989) in Switzerland.

He died at his London home, Chesham Place, Belgravia, in November 1968, and is buried in the churchyard of St James, Abinger Common, near his country home, Abinger Manor.
