= George Francis Carline =

English painter (1855–1920)

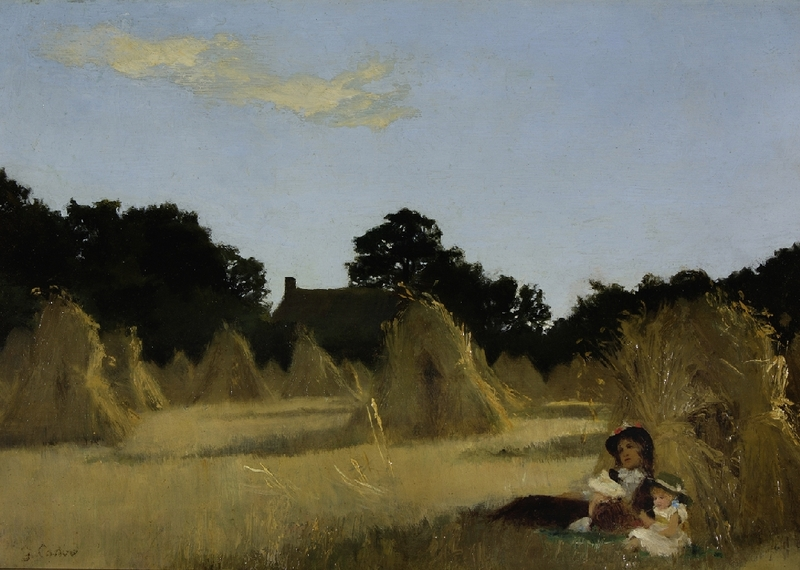
George F. Carline - A Harvest Landscape

George Francis Carline (11 July 1855 – 28 November 1920) was an oil and watercolour painter of landscapes and portraits. He exhibited at the Royal Academy, the Royal Institute of Painters in Watercolours, and the Dowdeswell Galleries, London. He was a member of the Royal Society of British Artists and father of artists Sydney, Hilda, and Richard Carline.

== Life and career ==
Carline was born in Lincoln and attended Lincoln Grammar School, then Lincoln School of Art. His art studies continued at the Heatherley School of Fine Art, London, and then in Antwerp and the Académie Julian in Paris.

Carline returned to London in 1885, and met and married Annie Smith (1862–1945). They had five children, including Sydney William (1888–1929), Richard Cotton (1896–1980), and Hilda Anne (1889–1950), who each developed into artists in their own right. Both Richard and Hilda also married artists, Nancy Higgins and Stanley Spencer respectively.

From 1886, he exhibited at the Royal Academy, and Royal Society of British Artists. and the Royal Institute of Painters in Watercolours. His In the Garden of Hollyhocks (1890) was described by The Birmingham Daily Post as well harmonised, bright and 'gorgeous'. In 1896, the Dowdeswell Galleries held an exhibition of 59 of his works, under the title The Home of our English Wild Flowers.

Amongst his portraiture were portraits of the historians Sir Charles Oman and Professor Sir Paul Vinogradoff, both residents of Oxford. to which he and his family had moved in 1892. He also illustrated Oxford, a book by the historian Andrew Lang, in 1915.

He died unexpectedly in Assisi, Italy, in 1920 aged 65.

== Selected works ==
• Spelling Out the List (1885) • In the Garden of Hollyhocks (1890) • The Ploughing Match (1892) • Armistice Night, Trafalgar Square (1918)
