= Unity Spencer =

British artist

- Born: 24 May 1930; Hampstead, London, England
- Died: 18 October 2017
- Occupation: Artist
- Partner: Leslie Lambert
- Children: 1
- Parent(s): Stanley Spencer; Hilda Carline

Unity Spencer (24 May 1930 – 18 October 2017) was a British artist. She was the daughter of artists Stanley Spencer and Hilda Carline.

== Biography ==
Unity Spencer was born on 24 May 1930 at her parents’ and grandparents’ home at 47 Downshire Hill in Hampstead, London, the second daughter of Stanley Spencer and his wife Hilda Carline, both artists. She was educated at the Badminton School, Wimbledon School of Art and the Slade School of Fine Art. Following the break-up of the Spencers' marriage by the mid-1930s, Unity lived with her mother, while her elder sister, Shirin, was sent to live with a relative, and the sisters grew up apart. She had one-person shows at Lauderdale House in Highgate in 1993, the Boundary Gallery in St John's Wood in 2001, and the Fine Art Society in Bond Street in 2015.

In 1961, she met Leslie Lambert (died 1971), and they had a son in 1963, but they never married. In the last eighteen months of her life, she moved to live in Cowbridge, south Wales, with her son John and sister Shirin Spencer. A BBC documentary, Stanley and His Daughters, shown after Unity's death, included interviews with both sisters in which they talked about their childhood and the decision to move in together.

Spencer died of kidney failure on 18 October 2017. She was buried in Cookham, Berkshire, close to her mother.
