= Gilbert Spencer =

English painter

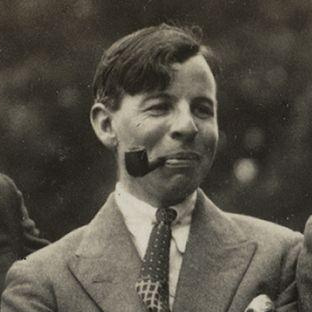
- A 1926 photo of Gilbert Spencer by Lady Ottoline Morrell
- Born: Gilbert Spencer; 4 August 1892; Cookham, Berkshire, England
- Died: 14 January 1979 (aged 86); Black Notley, Essex, England
- Education: Camberwell School of Arts and Crafts, the Royal College of Art and The Slade
- Known for: Painting
- Notable work: Many Landscape Views
- Children: Peter Spencer Coppock; Gillian Spencer
- Awards: RA

Gilbert Spencer RA (4 August 1892 – 14 January 1979) was a British painter of landscapes, portraits, figure compositions and mural decorations. He worked in oils and watercolour. He was the younger brother of the painter Stanley Spencer.

== Early life and education ==
Born at Cookham, Berkshire, on 4 August 1892, thirteen months after his more famous brother Stanley, Gilbert Spencer was the eighth son and youngest of the eleven children of William Spencer, organist and music teacher, and his wife, Anna Caroline Slack. The family had little spare money and the formal education of their children was sketchy, but what they lacked in schooling was made up for by the talk they heard between their elders at meal times.

Gilbert studied at Camberwell School of Arts and Crafts and the Royal College of Art (wood carving) 1911–12. Subsequently, Gilbert followed Stanley to the Slade School of Fine Art, London, in 1913, remaining until 1915. At the Slade, Gilbert came under the powerful influence of Henry Tonks, which remained with him to the end of his life. He won the coveted life drawing prize in 1914 and was runner-up for the summer competition prize, with a huge mural, The Seven Ages of Man (Art Gallery of Hamilton, Canada).

During the First World War, after somewhat pacifist misgivings on the part of both themselves and their mother, both Stanley and Gilbert served in the Royal Army Medical Corps, initially at the Beaufort War Hospital in Bristol. Gilbert was then drafted to the Macedonian front, serving in Salonika and in the Eastern Mediterranean 1915–19. He returned to his studies at The Slade after the war (1919–20).

== Development as an artist ==
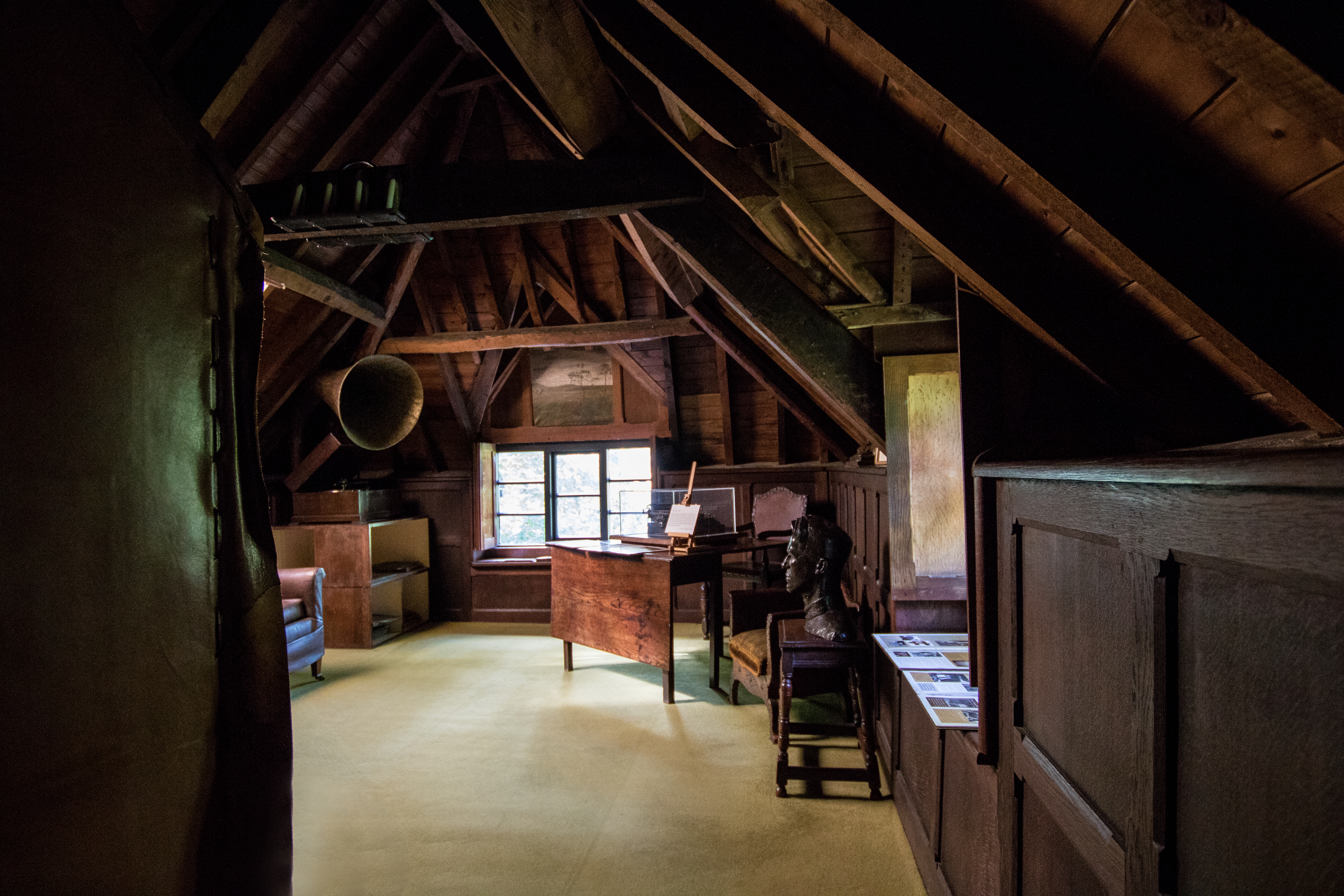
The Music Room in T. E. Lawrence's home, Clouds Hill; above the window is a landscape painting of Clouds Hill by Gilbert Spencer

Spencer painted portraits, genre scenes and murals but was primarily a landscape painter, focusing his attention on vistas of Berkshire, Oxfordshire, Dorset and the Lake District.

He became a member of the New English Art Club in 1919. That year, he met Hilda Carline, his brother's future wife, and her brother Sydney Carline. When he became Ruskin Master in 1922, Sydney Carline asked Spencer to join his staff at the University of Oxford. Lady Ottoline Morrell, with whom Spencer was friendly since before the war, found him a room in the village of Garsington near Oxford. She allowed him easy access to her own house, Garsington Manor, which was frequented by many illustrious guests including the Bloomsbury set. While living there, Spencer painted Trees at Garsington (Ashmolean Museum, Oxford), Garsington Roofs and The Sheep Fold at Upper Farm which "have a characteristic directness of line and clarity of colour."

1923 he had his first solo exhibition at the Goupil Gallery, London.

From 1934–6 he created a series of murals depicting the Foundation Legend of Balliol College for Holywell Manor, Oxford.

During the Second World War Spencer served in the 9th (Lakes) Battalion, Westmorland Home Guard while evacuated to the Lake District with staff and students from the Royal College of Art. He was employed as an official war artist, (1940–1943) commissioned to paint scenes of military training in England, and was one of several British artists to become an official artist in both world wars.

He was elected an Associate Royal Academician (A.R.A) in 1950 and a full member in 1959. He temporarily resigned his membership of the Royal Academy in 1968, before rejoining in 1971. The artist was widely exhibited during his lifetime and examples of his work are held in major public and private collections, including five paintings at the Tate Gallery amongst them ‘A Cotswold Farm’ (1930-1) and ‘The Progress of Husbandry’ (c.1964) and the Royal Academy, including ‘From My Studio’ (1959) A complete catalogue of Gilbert Spencer’s paintings, murals and many works on paper was launched in June 2025.

== Teaching ==
From 1932 to 1948 Gilbert Spencer was Professor of Painting at the Royal College of Art in London. He was also Head of the Department of Painting at Glasgow School of Art, 1948–50 and, from 1950 to 1957, was Head of Painting at Camberwell School of Arts and Crafts under the Principal Leonard Daniels.

== Private life ==
In 1922, while staying with fellow Slade graduate Thomas Saunders Nash (no relation of artists John or Paul Nash), Gilbert had an affair with Nash's wife Mabel, resulting in the birth of a son, Peter. Although Peter was registered as Peter Spencer at birth, he later added Mabel's new partner’s surname to become Peter Spencer Coppock as Gilbert did not formally acknowledge his paternity. At the behest of his wife, Gilbert did however pay for Peter's education and have him to stay during school holidays.

Gilbert Spencer married a former Slade School of Art student, Margaret Ursula Bradshaw (1898–1959) on 31 December 1930 at Holy Trinity Church, South Kensington, London. The artist John Nash (brother of Paul Nash) was his best man. The Spencers' daughter Gillian was born on 21 October 1936.

They lived at Tree Cottage, Upper Basildon, Berkshire from 1936–70. Thereafter, at the invitation of his friends and patrons the Martineau family, he retired to Walsham-le-Willows, Suffolk, and died at Lynderswood Court, Black Notley, Braintree, Essex, on 14 January 1979.

One obituary recognised Gilbert Spencer’s contribution to British painting, celebrating over one hundred paintings and drawings exhibited at the Royal Academy, and his clear place in the pantheon of English landscape artists. His works, it was written, “not only depict the countryside which by upbringing he loved so much but somehow convey their period. He might well be called the John Constable of the twentieth century.”

== Writing ==
Gilbert was commissioned in 1959-60 by Victor Gollancz to write a posthumous biography of his brother, Stanley Spencer (1961); he also wrote an illustrated autobiography Memoirs of a Painter (1974). In April 2024 Yale University Press published 'Gilbert Spencer: The Life and Work of a Very English Artist', by Paul Gough, with contributions by Sacha Llewellyn and Amanda Bradley Petitgas
