= Daphne Charlton =

British artist

- Self-portrait
- Born: Daphne Gribble; 1909; Near York, England
- Died: 1991 (aged 81–82); London, England
- Education: Slade School of Fine Art
- Known for: Painting

Daphne Charlton (née Gribble; 1909–1991) was a British artist.

== Biography ==
Charlton was born near York in the north of England and studied at the Slade School of Fine Art in London from 1927. At the Slade she met her future husband, George Charlton, who was a teacher there and whom she married in 1929. The couple settled in Hampstead in north London and the area became a frequent subject of her paintings. Among her fellow students at the Slade was Mary Adshead, who painted a notable portrait of Charlton in 1935.

Beginning in 1939, Charlton had an affair with Stanley Spencer after the breakdown of his second marriage and she appeared in several of his paintings, including The Woolshop and the double portrait On the Tiger Rug. Spencer painted several other portraits of Charlton, including the 1940 picture, now in the Tate, Daphne with her wearing a fashionable hat he bought for the sittings. A second portrait of Charlton by Spencer from the following year is much less flamboyant. One of Charlton's paintings of Spencer shows an unhappy individual resting against a pillow. An exhibition of George Charlton's work at The Chambers Gallery in 2005 included several paintings by Daphne Charlton. The Burgh House & Hampstead Museum in London holds several works by her.
