= John Arnone =

American set designer

John Arnone is an American set designer. He won a Tony Award in 1993 for set designs for the production of The Who's Tommy. He graduated from SMU and is a 2 time Obie award winner.

== Early career ==
John Arnone studied at SMU to become an actor. He then moved to New York with a group of friends that included Garland Wright, Jack Hefner, Powers Boothe and Kathy Bates. In 1976, Arnone started designing sets, primarily for Jack Hefner’s Vanities, which ended up running for five years. He started taking night classes at the Parsons School of Design.

== Career highlights ==
He has done set designs for Tommy Tune, playwright Edward Albee and choreographer Twyla Tharp. He’s worked at the Guthrie, the Mark Taper Forum and the Stratford Shakespeare Festival in Ontario.

Arnone is also co-founder of the New York’s Lion Theatre Company, where he has designed numerous productions on and off Broadway.

Arnone has also designed for several television sets and films such as Mondo Beyondo with Bette Midler on HBO in 1982.

== Awards ==
- Outstanding Set Design Drama Desk Award - 1993 for production of The Who's Tommy
- Tony Award for Set Design - 1993 for production of The Who's Tommy
- Obie Award for Sustained Excellence in 1992 for Off-Broadway contributions to the theatrical community

== Set Designs ==
- Volpone [Off-Broadway, 2012]
- The Lady from Dubuque [Off-Broadway, 2012]
- Black Tie [Off-Broadway, 2011]
- Nightmare Alley, Geffen Playhouse
- Oroonoko [Off-Broadway, 2008]
- Whistlin' Dixie, L.A's Geffen Playhouse, 2007
- Mimi le Duck [Off-Broadway, 2006]
- Mimi Le Duck [Off-Broadway, 2006]
- Indian Blood [Off-Broadway, 2006]
- Lennon [Broadway, 2005]
- Fortune's Fool[Broadway, 2002]
- Scenic Designer
- The Full Monty [West End, 2002]
- The Goat, or Who Is Sylvia? [Broadway, 2002]
- Dracula[Regional (US), 2001]
- The Full Monty [US Tour, 2001]
- Tiny Alice [Off-Broadway, 2000]
- The Full Monty [Broadway, 2000]
- Gore Vidal's The Best Man [Broadway, 2000]
- The Full Monty [San Diego, CA (Regional), 2000]
- Wake Up and Smell the Coffee [Off-Broadway, 2000]
- Family Week [Off-Broadway, 2000]
- The Ride Down Mt. Morgan [Broadway, 2000]
- Waste [Off-Broadway, 2000]
- The Play About the Baby [Off-Broadway, 2000]
- Minnelli on Minnelli [Broadway, 1999]
- Marlene [Broadway, 1999]
- The Ride Down Mt. Morgan [Off-Broadway, 1998]
- The Deep Blue Sea [Broadway, 1998]
- Antony and Cleopatra [Off-Broadway, 1997]
- Sex and Longing [Broadway, 1996]
- Sacrilege [Broadway, 1995]
- How to Succeed in Business Without Really Trying [Broadway, 1995]
- The Merchant of Venice [Off-Broadway, 1995]
- Grease [Broadway, 1994]
- The Best Little Whorehouse Goes Public [Broadway, 1994]
- Twilight: Los Angeles, 1992 [Broadway, 1994]
- Twilight: Los Angeles 1992 [Off-Broadway, 1994]
- Pounding Nails in the Floor [Off-Broadway, 1994]
- The Who's Tommy [Broadway, 1993]
- The End of the Day [Off-Broadway, 1992]
