= Sydney Carline =

British artist (1888-1929)

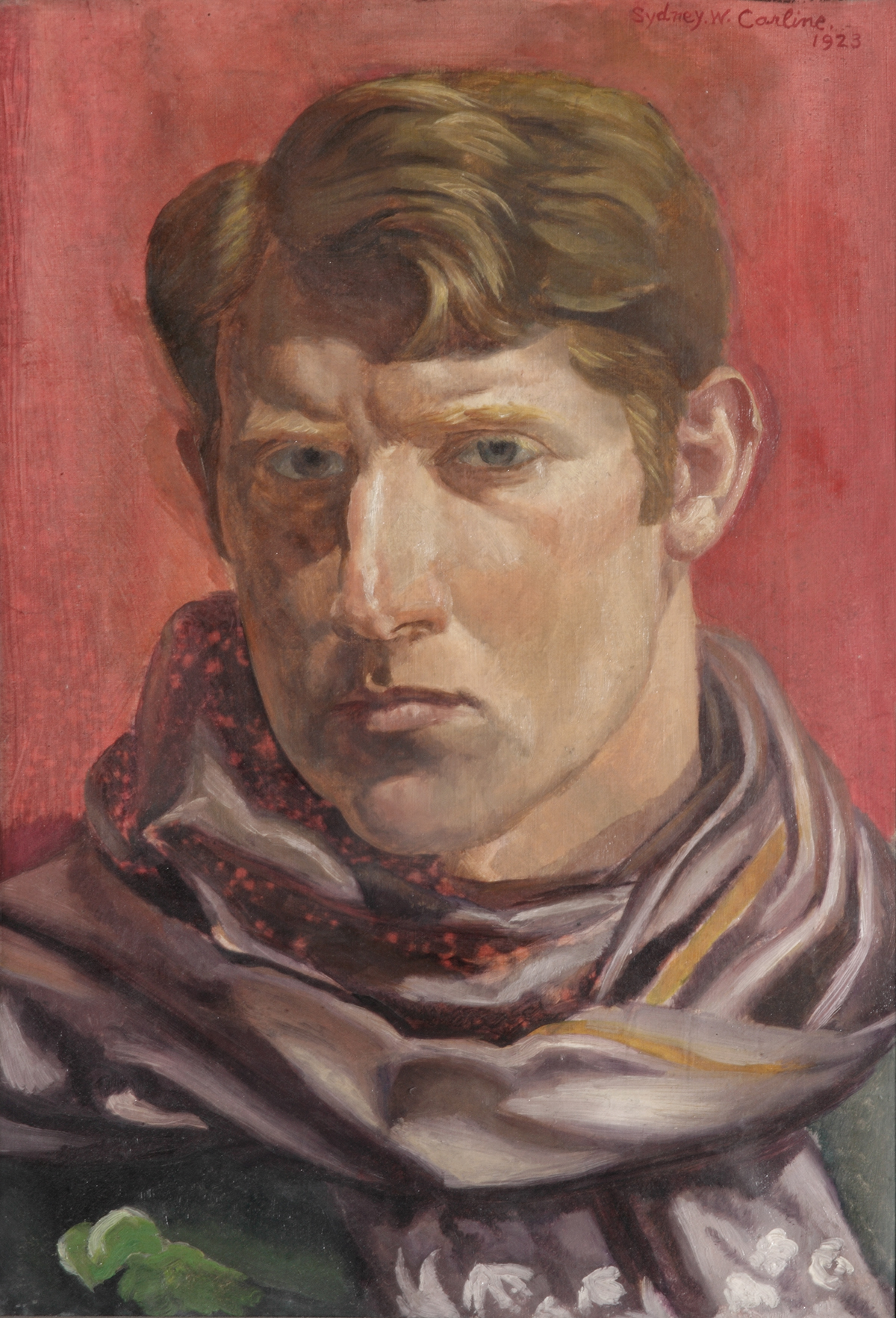
- Self Portrait (Ruskin Master, 1922–1929), 1923
- Born: 14 August 1888; London, England
- Died: 14 February 1929 (aged 40); Drayton St Leonard, Oxfordshire, England
- Education: Slade School of Art
- Known for: Painting, drawing
- Spouse: Gwendolen Harter (m.1928)

Sydney William Carline (14 August 1888 – 14 February 1929) was a British artist and teacher known for his depictions of aerial combat painted during World War One.

== Biography ==
=== Early life ===
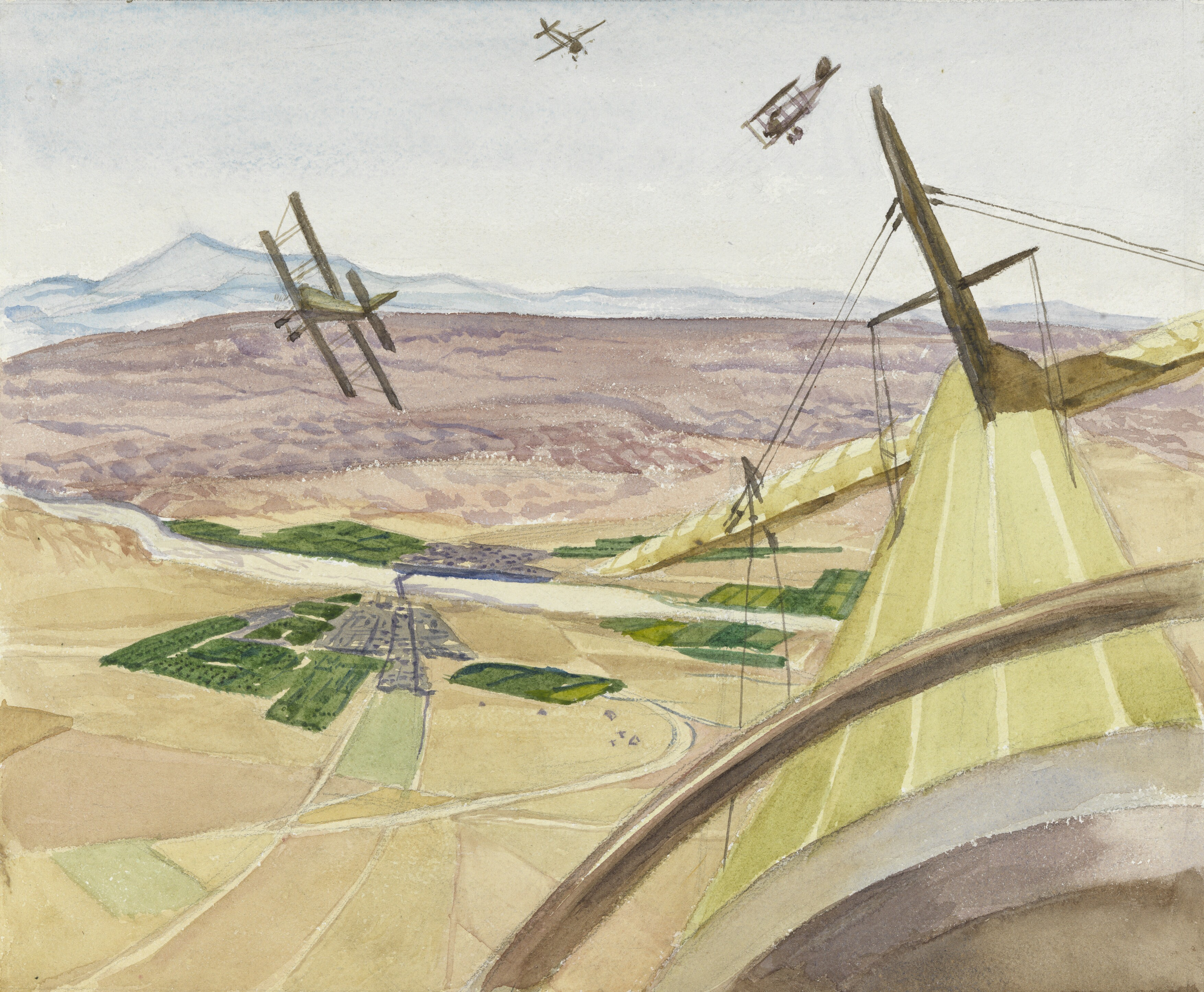
Flying Above Kirkuk, Kurdistan (1919) (Art.IWM ART 4637)

Sydney Carline was born in London, the son of the artist George Francis Carline and Annie Smith (1862–1945). His brother, Richard Carline and his sister Hilda were also artists, as was his sister-in-law, Nancy (née Higgins), and his brother-in-law, Stanley Spencer. Sydney Carline was educated at Repton School before he studied at the Slade School of Art, between 1907 and 1910, and then in Paris. In 1914 he spent time painting in Westmoreland.

=== World War One ===
When the First World War began Carline joined the British Army and trained as a dispatch rider. He became a pilot in the Royal Flying Corps and was commissioned 15 March 1916. He was shot down and wounded, over the Somme but survived and went on to pilot a Sopwith Camel fighter on the Italian Front in late 1917. During the first years of the war, during intervals in his war duties, Carline worked on the design of a medal commemorating the Battle of Jutland and also a design for a 'Next of Kin' medal. During his time in Italy he established a studio in a museum building in Vicenza and had, on an unofficial basis, been sketching combat scenes since February 1918. His brother, Richard, put him forward to be an official war artist and, in that capacity, he painted aerial battles on the Italian front from July to November 1918, usually sketching from a Sopwith Camel.

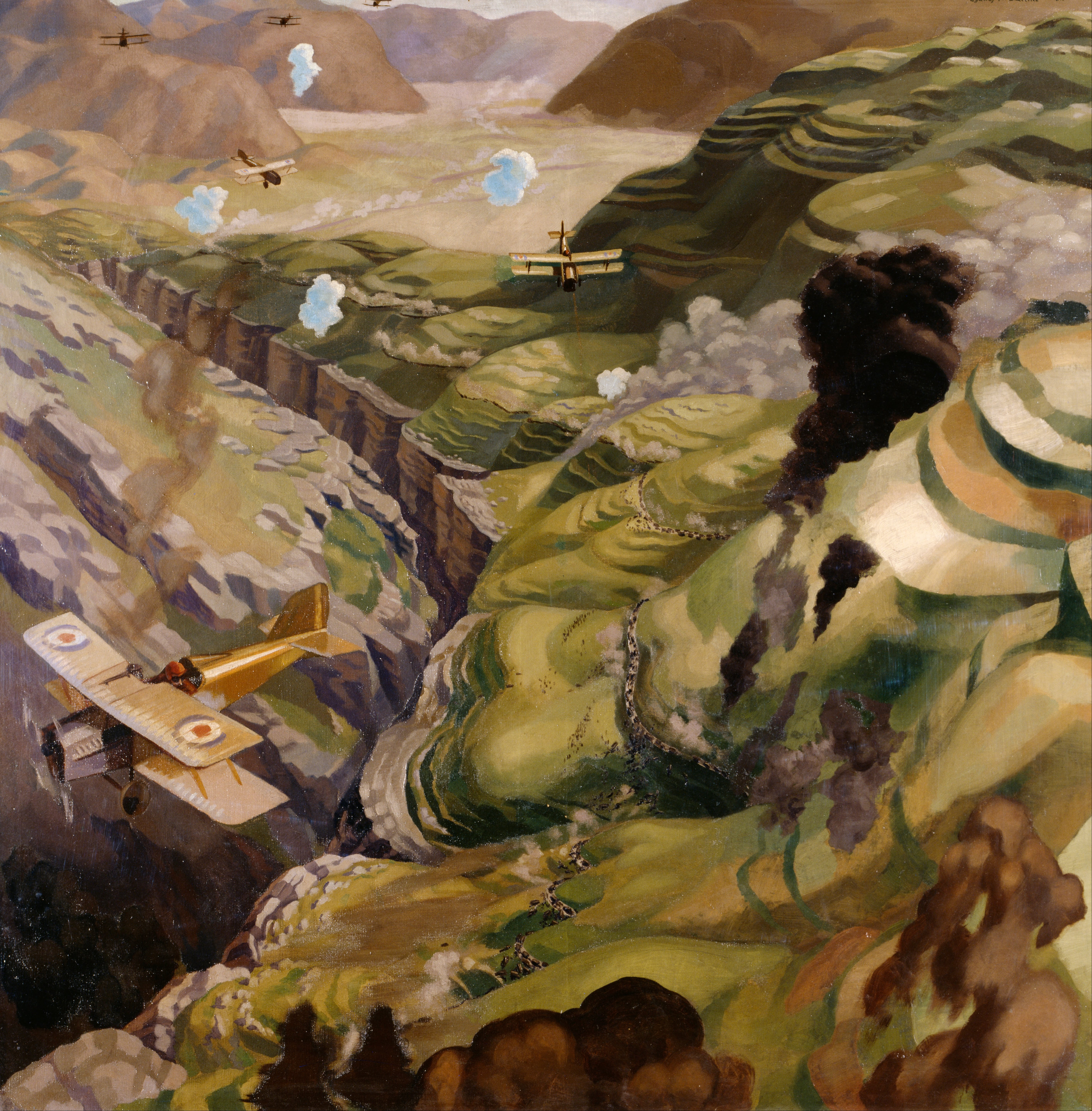
The Destruction of the Turkish Transport in the Gorge of the Wadi Fara, Palestine; this was published in Seven Pillars of Wisdom

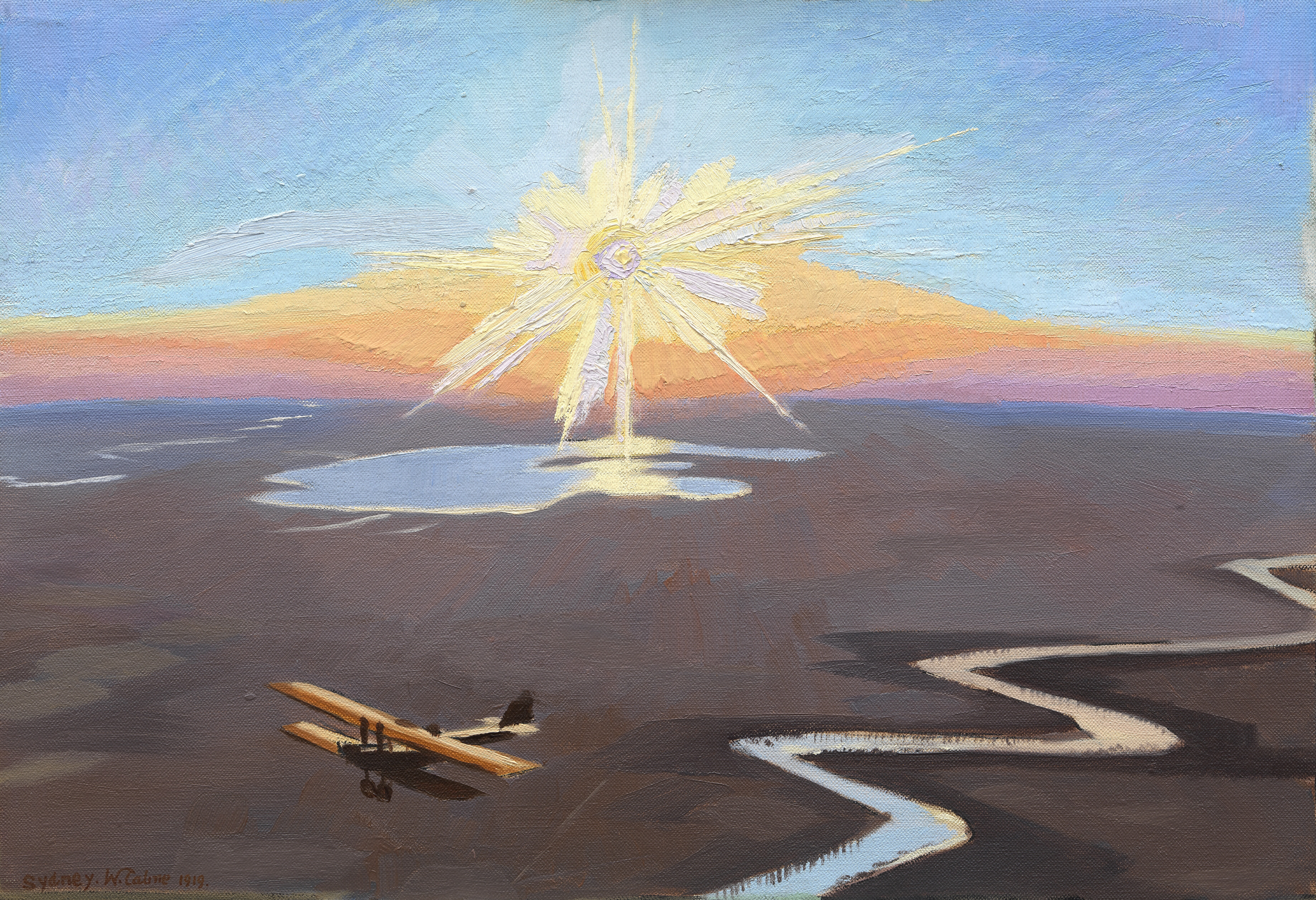
Flying Over the Desert at Sunset, Mesopotamia (1919) (Art.IWM ART 4623)

In January 1919 both the Carline brothers were sent to the Middle East by the Imperial War Museum, IWM, as official war artists for the Royal Air Force, RAF, with a brief to depict aerial combat. The brothers arrived in Port Said in January 1919 and then travelled to Ramleh where they were based with No. 1 Squadron of the Australian Flying Corps. From there they moved to Jerusalem and began to travel around the region, often visiting historical and archaeological sites, alongside their military duties. Near Aleppo they sketched the results of the RAF bombing raids on the Turkish airbase at Rayak. At Wadi Fara Sydney made a set of studies which eventually became the painting The Destruction of the Turkish Transport in the Gorge of the Wadi Fara, Palestine, which depicted an RAF attack on a Turkish column in a steep gorge. After some time in Beirut the brothers returned to flying duties, with Sydney making several flights over Wadi Fara and the Sea of Galilee. The brothers stayed in Cairo before moving to Baghdad where they remained until the middle of July when they went to Mosul from where the RAF were planning bombing raids against the Kurdish uprising. Before that action they were recalled to England for demobilisation and arrived home in November 1919. Although between them the brothers had enough sketches for twenty-five major paintings, the RAF Section of the IWM had no funds left to acquire new paintings. Eventually the Museum paid Sydney for four finished paintings and bought three from Richard. The brothers were allowed to keep the 300 plus sketches they had made in the Middle East and these formed the basis of their successful Goupil Gallery exhibition in March 1920.

=== Later life ===
Before the war Carline had exhibited at the Royal Academy and after the war he resumed doing so until 1927. In 1922 he was appointed Ruskin Master of Drawing at Oxford University and in 1924 he was elected a member of the London Group. In 1926 he created illustrations for T. E. Lawrence's book Revolt in the Desert. In April 1928, Carline married Gwendolen Harter. The following year he died of pneumonia, which developed after a visit to John Nash on a particularly cold evening. A number of memorial exhibitions were held in his memory and Richard Carline donated over a hundred of his works to the Imperial War Museum.

During the first quarter of 2017 an exhibition of Carline's paintings from Italy in 1917–18 was held at the Estorick Collection of Modern Italian Art gallery in London.
