= Downshire Hill =

Street in Hampstead, London

Coordinates: 51.5560°N 0.1699°W

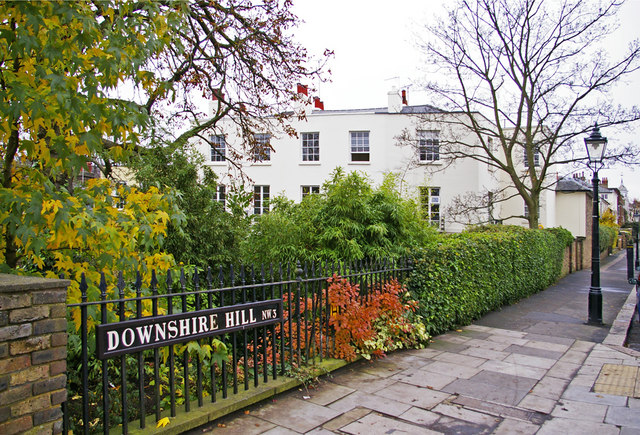
Downshire Hill

Downshire Hill is a street in Hampstead, London, in the London Borough of Camden. The street has always been a preferred residential address, in which the artists Dante Gabriel Rossetti and Stanley Spencer and the actress Peggy Ashcroft as well as the scientist J. D. Bernal and Peter Medawar resided.

== Geography ==
The road runs between the A 502 (Rosslyn Hill) in the southwest and East Heath Road / South End Road in the northeast. The only branches are Keats Grove and Willow Road. While the road ends in the northeast on the edge of the Hampstead Heath nature park, it is "continued" in a south-westerly direction by Thurlow Road.

On the grounds between Downshire Hill and Keats Grove is the St John's Downshire Hill.

== History ==
The road was laid out at the beginning of the 19th century and is probably named after the first Marquess of Downshire, Wills Hill (1718–1793).

== Known residents ==
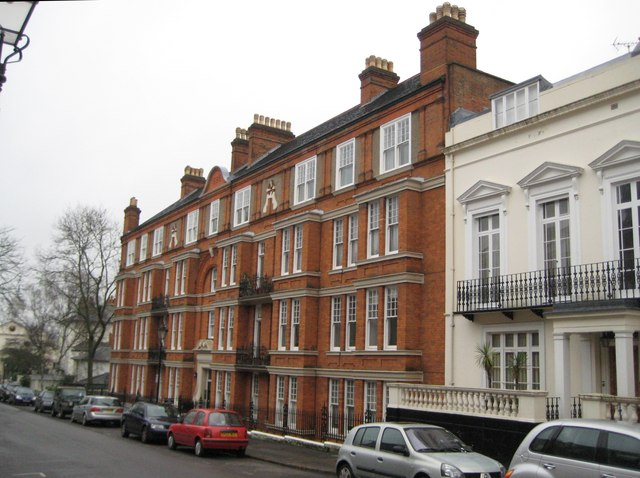
Hampstead Hill Mansions

The Gothic Revival architect Temple Moore and later, during the First World War, the literary figures Constance, Edward and David Garnett lived in house number 6.

In the 1930s the Scottish writer Edwin Muir and then the two-time Wimbledon finalist Bunny Austin lived under number 7.

At the turn of the century, the actor Edward Gordon Craig and the composer Martin Shaw shared house number 8.

The author Sylvia Dryhurst was born in house number 11. After their marriage to the writer Robert Lynd the couple moved into the neighboring building number 14 and lived there until 1918.

The artist Roland Penrose and photographer Lee Miller lived in building number 21 and the biologist Peter Medawar number 25.

The painter John Constable had stayed in the same house for a short time in the previous century. At number 35 the physicist J. D. Bernal lived in the late 1930s, and in the neighbouring house number 37 the actress Flora Robson at about the same time.

The Regency House at number 47 was owned by the family of Richard Carline from 1914 onwards and during that time became the meeting place of what became known as the Hampstead Group of artists and thinkers . The artists who gathered there included Hilda Carline, her then husband Stanley Spencer and Jaz Wood. In September 1938 it was acquired by the Stuttgart-born writer and artist Fred Uhlman and his wife Diana Uhlman (née Croft).

Together with other people immigrated from Germany, they soon founded the Artists' Refugee Committee (ARC), which had its official seat under number 47. The ARC sheltered persecuted artists. One of them was the German Dadaist John Heartfield. It was originally intended for him to be accommodated for two weeks, but he ended up spending five years there.

Soon after, the writer Elizabeth Jenkins moved to the Regency House and named her 2004 memoir (The View from Downshire Hill) after the street.

The puppeteer, film director and creator of The Muppets, Jim Henson lived at 50 Downshire Hill.

It was only in 1896 that the Hampstead Hill Mansions made it possible to move into a single apartment in the area. The most famous resident of this residential complex was the actress Peggy Ashcroft, who had moved there temporarily in 1946. The poet and painter Dante Gabriel Rossetti lived with his wife Elizabeth Siddal for a short time in the neighbouring Spring Cottage.

The Pink Floyd drummer Nick Mason grew up in Downshire Hill after his family moved here from Birmingham in 1946.
