= Richard Carline =

English painter (1896-1980)

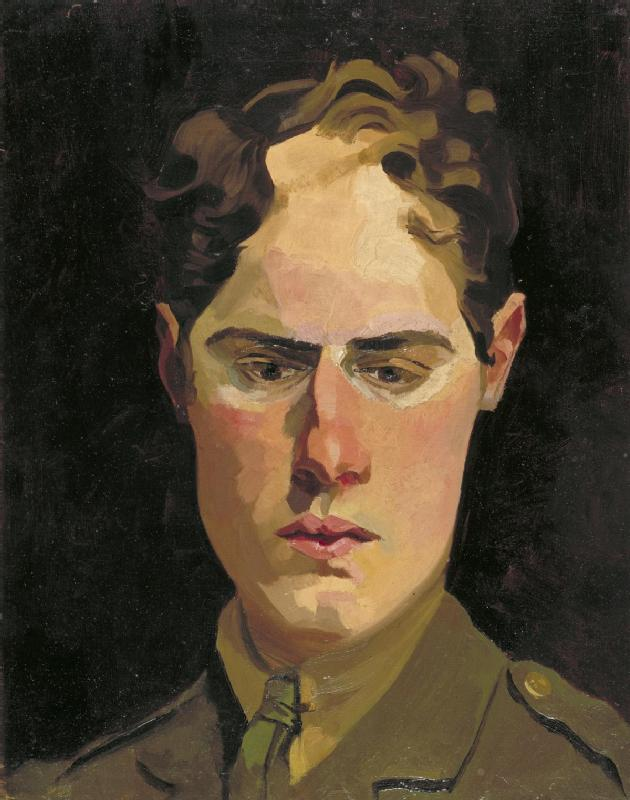
- Self-portrait in uniform (1918)
- Born: 9 February 1896; Oxford, England
- Died: 18 November 1980 (aged 84); Hampstead, London, England
- Education: Academie de Peinture
- Known for: Painting
- Spouse: Nancy Carline

Richard Cotton Carline (9 February 1896 – 18 November 1980) was a British artist, arts administrator and writer. During the First World War, Carline served on the Western Front and in the Middle East, where he travelled extensively through Palestine, Syria, India and modern day Iran and Iraq. Although known for his depictions of aerial combat painted during World War One, from the mid-1930s, his output as an artist was overshadowed by his numerous roles in local, national and international artists' organisations. Carline held strong anti-fascist beliefs and also worked to gain appreciation for African art, naive art, child artists and even promote the artistic merits of postcard images.

== Biography ==
=== Early life ===
Richard Carline was born in Oxford, the youngest of the five children born to the artist George Francis Carline and Anne Smith (1862-1945). His brother, Sydney Carline and his sister Hilda were also artists, as was his brother-in-law, Sir Stanley Spencer. Richard Carline was educated at the Dragon School and at St Edward's School in Oxford before studying art under Percyval Tudor-Hart at the Academie de Peinture in Paris and then in London throughout 1913.

=== World War One ===
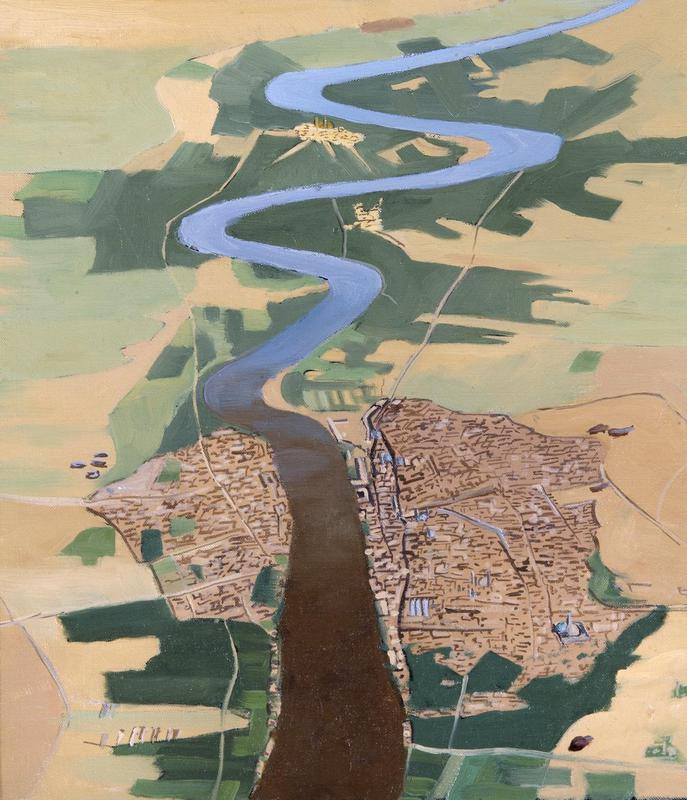
Baghdad, 1919 (Art.IWM ART 6348)

During the First World War, Carline joined the Middlesex Regiment of the British army in 1916, before transferring to the Royal Flying Corps, RFC, in 1917. He worked on wireless communications before he was tasked with developing camouflage designs for aeroplanes. From September 1917 until the spring of 1918 he was employed by the Air Ministry to paint large surveys of the front lines in France onto canvas, for which he established a studio close to the family home in Hampstead. After completing a course in aerial gunnery Carline was based, from July 1918, on the Western Front at Hesdin for six months. During this time he flew Bristol fighters in combat over the front lines.

Carline was asked to nominate artists to work as official war artists for the RFC. He nominated his own brother, Sydney, who was also in the RFC and had already been shot down once. In January 1919 both brothers were sent to the Middle East by the Imperial War Museum, as official war artists for the Royal Air Force with a brief to depict aerial combat. The brothers arrived in Port Said in January 1919 and then travelled to Ramleh where they were based with No. 1 Squadron of the Australian Flying Corps. From there they moved to Jerusalem and began to travel around the region to visit other historical and archaeological sites, alongside their military duties. Near Aleppo they sketched the results of the RAF bombing raids on the Turkish airbase at Rayak. After some time in Beirut they returned to flying duties, with Richard making several flights over Jerusalem and Gaza which became the basis for his painting Jerusalem and the Dead Sea From an Aeroplane. In several of his aerial paintings, Carline showed the influence of the Cubist artworks he had seen in Paris before the war as he adopted unconventional perspectives to depict the ground below as two-dimensional and abstracted.

The brothers stayed in Cairo before moving to Baghdad where they remained until the middle of July when they went to Mosul from where the RAF were planning bombing raids against the Kurdish uprising. However, before that action, they were recalled to England for demobilisation and arrived home in November 1919. Although between them the brothers had enough sketches for twenty-five large paintings the RAF Section of the IWM had no funds left to acquire new paintings. Eventually the Museum paid Richard for three finished paintings and bought four from Sydney. The brothers were allowed to keep the 300 plus sketches they had made in the Middle East and these formed the basis of their successful Groupil Gallery exhibition in March 1920.

=== Inter-war years ===
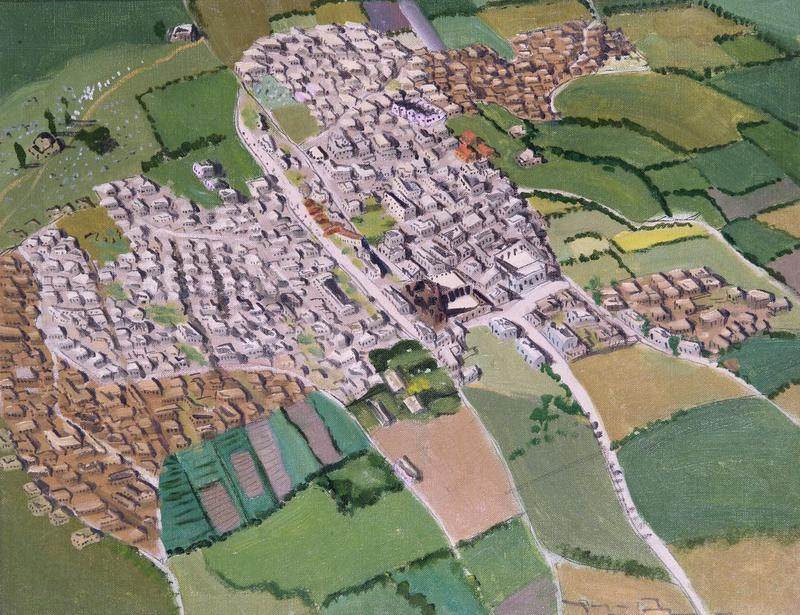
Gaza Seen From the Air, Over British Lines on Ali Muntar Hill Looking Towards the Sea (Art.IWM ART 6350)

In 1920 Richard was elected to the London Group. Between 1921 and 1924, Carline studied part-time at the Slade School of Art before teaching, on an occasional basis, at the Ruskin School of Drawing and Fine Art at Oxford University until 1929, where his brother, Sydney, was Master of Drawing. Throughout 1928, he undertook an extensive lecture tour of north America. In 1931 Carline held his first one-man exhibition at the Groupil Gallery. The Carline family home at 47 Downshire Hill in Hampstead became the centre of an artistic circle that included Henry Lamb, Stanley Spencer, Mark Gertler and John Nash. A least three of Carline's most important works feature the house, which became a meeting place for artists and writers in the 1939s and 40s. His 1925 painting Gathering on the Terrace at 47 Downshire Hill, Hampstead is now held by the Ferens Gallery in Hull. It depicts several members of his family and friends. Two other works Gilbert and Janet Pairing up for Tennis and Kitchen at 47 Downshire Hill established his reputation as a major British post-impressionist. The latter was acquired by the Tate Gallery, but was lost in the devastating flood of 1928. In 1935, with Michael Sadler, Carline wrote a book entitled Arts of West Africa and organized an accompanying exhibition on the subject. Carline was active in the Artists' International Association and during 1937 and 1938 he spent time in Mexico and the United States on their behalf supporting various arts' projects. In the run-up to World War Two, in 1938, Carline was among the founding members of the Artists' Refugee Committee in Hampstead.

=== World War II and later life ===
During World War II Carline worked for the Air Ministry designing camouflage patterns for their aircraft and factories and wrote the Ministry of Aircraft Production's official report on industrial and aircraft camouflage. In 1943 Carline established the National Mural Council to promote the commissioning of murals by industry. In 1944 he had a role in founding the Hampstead Artists' Council and went on to hold senior posts in several artists' bodies. In 1946 he was the first Art Counsellor of UNESCO and was the UK Vice-President of the International Association of Artists. In both 1957 and 1963 he organized exhibitions of British art in China for the Britain China Friendship Association. In 1950 Carline married Nancy Higgins whom he had known for many years and who was an artist in her own right. The couple served as art examiners for the University of Cambridge Local Examinations Syndicate from 1955 to 1974 and travelled extensively in Asia and Africa in that role.

== Published works ==
- The Arts of West Africa (1935), edited by Sir Michael Sadler
- Pictures in the Post, the Story of the Picture Postcard, Faber, (1959)
- Draw they Must (1968)
- Stanley Spencer at War, Faber & Faber (1978)
