= Patricia Preece =

English artist

Patricia Preece in 1928

Patricia Preece, Lady Spencer (22 January 1894 – 19 May 1966), born Ruby Vivian Preece, also known as Peggy, was an English artist, associated with the Bloomsbury Group, and the second wife of painter Stanley Spencer, for whom she modelled. It was later discovered that nearly all of the artwork exhibited and sold by Preece was painted by her lifelong lover, Dorothy Hepworth.

As a teenager, in 1911, Preece was involved in the death of dramatist W. S. Gilbert. While swimming in his lake, she lost her footing and called out; the 74-year-old Gilbert dived in to assist her, but he died of a heart attack. She soon adopted the name Patricia and became engaged, but her progressive views displeased her fiancé, who terminated their engagement. In 1918 Preece met Hepworth at the Slade School of Fine Art. After further studies in Paris, the two returned to Britain. Throughout their lives, the gregarious Preece exhibited and sold the shy Hepworth's paintings under her own name, while Preece painted very little herself. The fraud caused the artist Augustus John to declare Preece one of the six greatest women artists in England.

In 1928, Preece and Hepworth moved to Cookham and befriended the artist Stanley Spencer. Spencer became obsessed with the flirtatious Preece, and he showered her with gifts. She persuaded him to divorce his first wife and to sign his house over to her. Preece married Spencer in 1937, but she did not leave Hepworth and refused to have sexual relations with Spencer. She eventually evicted Spencer from the house, and would not grant him a divorce, but continued to receive payments from him. The Preece-Spencer relationship was dramatised in the 1996 play Stanley, which won the Olivier Award for Best New Play. After Spencer was knighted in 1959, Preece insisted on being styled Lady Spencer and claimed a pension as his widow. In later years, she traded in antiques.

== Early life; death of Gilbert ==
Preece was born in Kensington in London to an Army officer, James Duncan Preece (1866–1940), and Ada Maude Webb (1865–1936), who married in 1891 in Kensington. She had an elder sister, Sibyl Duncan Preece (1892–1991), and a younger brother, Graham Duncan Preece (1899–1975). By 1911, Preece and her brother were boarding at a school at 76 Welldon Crescent, Harrow. The school was run by two young women, Rebbie Freuer Wright (b. 1886) and Winifred Isabel Emery (1890–1972), the niece of the actors Cyril Maude and Winifred Emery.

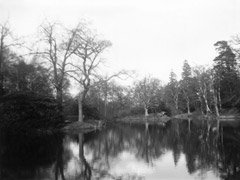
Gilbert's Lake, seen in 1899

Dramatist W. S. Gilbert, a friend of the Emery family, had an estate nearby called Grim's Dyke, on which there was a lake some distance from the house. On 29 May 1911, the 74-year-old Gilbert had arranged to give a swimming lesson in the lake to Preece and Emery. The three met at about 4 pm that day, and the young women entered the water before Gilbert. At the subsequent coroner's inquest, Preece stated, "I found that I could not stand and called out and Sir William swam to me. I put my hand on his shoulder and I felt him suddenly sink. I thought he would come up again. My feet were on the mud then. Miss Emery called for help and the gardeners came with the boat." The family doctor, Dr W.W. Shackleton, and Dr Daniel Wilson of nearby Bushey Heath Cottage Hospital, certified that Gilbert had died at about 4:20 pm that afternoon of syncope (heart failure) brought on by excessive exertion. The coroner's jury, meeting on 31 May 1911, recorded a verdict of accidental death. The incident is described in the documentary Metro-land. Newspapers printed verbatim the statement that Preece had given at the inquest, and they described her as a "fair-haired seventeen-year-old schoolgirl." Her father was a named mourner at Gilbert's funeral.

A year later, Preece had changed her first name to Patricia. She was at a finishing school in Lytham St Annes and became engaged to an officer in the Royal Naval Reserve. She returned to London during World War I and lived in Kensington with her mother and sister while her father was serving in the war. She sketched fashion illustrations for periodicals, drove ambulances and became involved with the suffragette movement. Her fiancé ended their engagement.

== Art studies; the Spencers ==
Stanley Spencer as a young man

In 1918, Preece enrolled at the Slade School of Fine Art, where she met Dorothy Hepworth, a talented artist who became her lifelong companion. With the help of Hepworth's wealthy family, they set up a home and studio together. Both studied drawing with Henry Tonks. Preece's early work was praised by Vanessa Bell, Duncan Grant, and Roger Fry. In the early 1920s, they lived mostly in Paris to continue their art studies, Preece studying principally with André Lhote. There, they were influenced by the lesbian art world of Natalie Barney's salon. Upon their return to London in 1925, however, they tried to avoid the opprobrium suffered by open lesbians and often claimed to be sisters. They became more involved with the Bloomsbury Group, some of the members of which they had met earlier. They spent summer holidays in Wales or Cornwall where Preece was again rescued from drowning, this time by a local mineworker. Preece had a reputation for happily accepting casual flirtations from admirers, only to reject them when they became more serious. In 1928, Preece and Hepworth moved to Cookham, living in a cottage purchased by Hepworth's parents. The gregarious Preece signed many of the shy Hepworth's paintings and negotiated with dealers to exhibit and sell the work as Preece's, fooling many in the art world, including the artist Augustus John, who declared Preece one of the six greatest women artists in England.

In 1929, Preece met Cookham artist Stanley Spencer and his artist wife, Hilda Carline, while she was substituting as a waitress in a teashop in Cookham. Preece and Hepworth became friendly with Spencer and his wife, sometimes minding their daughters and joining their art picnics. Carline's brother Richard was attracted and took Preece dining and dancing, until he understood the nature of her relationship with Hepworth. Hepworth's parents lost their fortune in the Great Depression, and from 1930, after Preece's father died, Preece and Hepworth were struggling to make mortgage payments. Spencer introduced Preece to his extensive art-world contacts. In May 1933, Spencer's cosmopolitan patron, Edward Beddington-Behrens invited Preece to travel with Stanley to Switzerland for a commission (Preece spoke fluent French, while Stanley spoke none). In 1933, Preece first modelled for Spencer, sitting for Portrait of Patricia Preece. By 1934, Spencer was concerned about Preece's finances and deteriorating health. He suggested that Preece and Hepworth move into the top floor of his house, but they did not do so. Carline was also concerned about their artist friends but was already suspicious of Spencer's relationship with Preece. Nevertheless, in 1934, Spencer persuaded Carline to paint a portrait of Preece. The resulting image shows both Carline's ambivalent feelings about Preece and the latter's change in demeanour since her more lighthearted days of financial independence.

Hepworth (left), Preece, Spencer and Jas Wood (right) at the wedding of Preece and Spencer

Soon afterwards, it became obvious that Spencer was obsessed with Preece. Carline spent more time with her mother and two daughters in Hampstead. Preece used her awareness of Spencer's sexual interest in her to manipulate him. Carline later wrote: "She vamped him to a degree unbelievable. … If he went to her house, she always received him half or quarter dressed." He bought her large amounts of clothing, jewellery and other gifts. Spencer's fantasy was to have both Carline and Preece as wives, both inspiring his art. In 1935, Preece accompanied Spencer for a second commission in Switzerland. Between 1935 and 1937, Spencer painted his famous series of nude portraits of Preece. Preece, aware of Spencer's fantasy for her to be his wife, insisted that he must obtain a divorce from Carline. Spencer became convinced that if he married Preece, he would then be able to persuade Carline to join them in a ménage-à-trois. Spencer's contact with his daughters became limited; his older daughter Shirin later commented that, even as a young child, "I knew what she was doing to Daddy."

== Marriage and later years ==
After receiving numerous pleading letters from her husband, Carline divorced Spencer in 1937, and less than a week later, he married Preece in Maidenhead. Preece and Hepworth, however, travelled together to St. Ives for the "honeymoon", while Spencer remained in Cookham to finish a painting. Carline went to Cookham and, finding a warm welcome from Spencer, she spent the night with him. Spencer explained his idea of a three-way marriage to her, but she could not accept being his mistress, having been his wife. Preece professed to be shocked by his "adultery" with Carline and refused thereafter to have sexual relations with him. Preece persuaded Spencer to sign his house and financial affairs over to her. Preece continued to exhibit Hepworth's paintings as her own. Curator Michael Dickens stated that Preece "did very little painting in her life." No one discovered the fraud during their lifetime, although Spencer mentioned in a letter to his friend Jas Wood that he had never seen Preece paint. Virginia Woolf bought and liked two drawings so much that she asked Preece to paint a portrait of her friend Ethel Smyth. Preece was reportedly alarmed and said that she could not do it unless Smyth came to her studio.

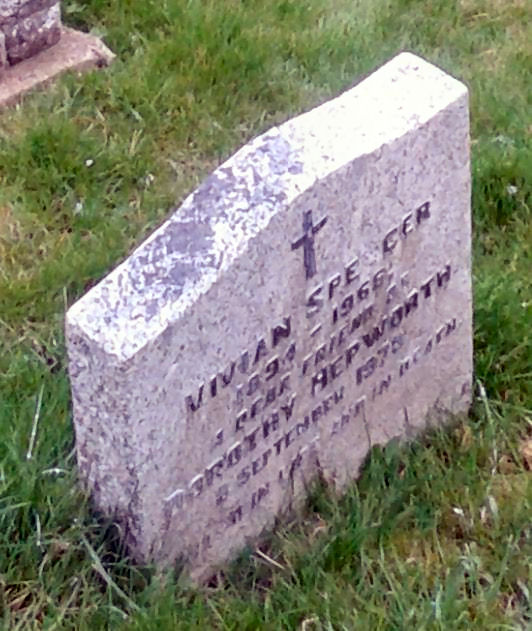
The grave of Preece and Hepworth in Cookham Parish Cemetery in 2018

Now maintaining two families and three houses, Spencer's finances rapidly deteriorated, and he was sued for debt. Preece continued to live with Hepworth. They evicted Spencer from his home in Cookham in 1938 in order to rent it out; Spencer fled to London, where his museum friends and art dealer helped him to put his finances in order, although he was forced to live modestly for many years. Spencer had two serious affairs but continued to love, and frequently visit, his first wife, until her death in 1950. Spencer attempted to divorce Preece in the 1950s, but she hired lawyers and prevented this. After he was knighted in 1959, she always insisted on being styled Lady Spencer and claimed a pension as his widow. During the post-war years, she also conducted a profitable hobby in trading antiques. Hepworth continued to paint, and her paintings continued to be exhibited under Preece's name, even after Preece's death.

== Death and legacy ==
Preece died in May 1966 aged 72, in Maidenhead, Berkshire. Hepworth survived her by a dozen years, slowly losing her eyesight, and was sometimes cared for by Preece's sister Sybil from London. She died aged 80 in 1978. Preece (as Vivian Spencer) and Hepworth are buried together in Cookham Cemetery under a common monument (pictured). Carline had earlier been laid to rest in the cemetery. Spencer's remains were cremated and buried in the churchyard of the church in Cookham.

Preece's posthumous memoir of her life with Spencer (earlier written with Louise Collis) was published by Heinemann in 1972 as Stanley Spencer: A Private View. The intricacies of the Preece-Spencer-Carline relationship became the subject in 1996 of a play by the feminist playwright Pam Gems. Titled Stanley, it played at the National Theatre and, later, on Broadway. It won the Olivier Best New Play award for 1997.
