= Dorothy Hepworth =

British painter (1894–1978)

Dorothy Hepworth (left), with Preece, Spencer and Jas Wood (right) at the wedding of Preece and Spencer, 1937

Dorothy Mary Hepworth (30 September 1894 – 8 September 1978) was a British painter and the life partner of Patricia Preece. Hepworth signed Preece's name to many of her own paintings, even after Preece's death.

== Early life ==
Hepworth was born in 1894 in Leicester, Leicestershire, the older of two daughters of Adela née Jarvis (1865–1954) and Alfred James Hepworth (1859–1930), the owner of a hosiery warehouse. She also had a younger brother, Eric Pachley Hepworth (1897–1898). She attended the Leicester School of Art from 1912. Hepworth moved on to the Slade School of Fine Art in 1917, where she met Patricia Preece, and from which she graduated with first class honours in 1919. She and Preece became lovers. While still a student, Hepworth began exhibiting her work. After graduation, she spent four years with Preece in Paris, where Hepworth studied at the Académie Colarossi and Preece was a pupil of André Lhote. They returned to England in 1925, where they relocated to Cookham for Hepworth's health. The two received financial help from Hepworth's wealthy father to purchase a house there, but Hepworth's father lost his fortune in the stock market crash of 1929. Hepworth's father died in 1930, and afterwards Hepworth and Preece experienced difficulty making the mortgage payments on their home. Preece and Hepworth were closeted about their relationship as was common at that time, and sometimes claimed to be sisters.

== Career ==
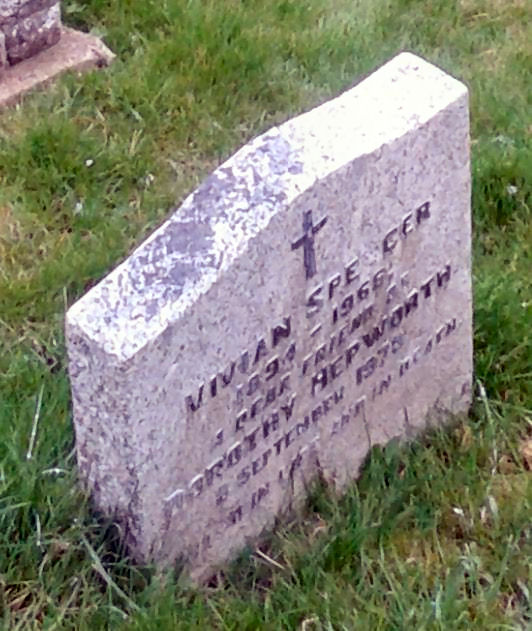
The grave of Hepworth and Preece in Cookham Parish churchyard in 2018

It is believed that many, if not all, of the much-accoladed paintings of Preece were created by Hepworth. Preece attributed the paintings to herself, with the consent of Hepworth, who was shy and preferred not to appear in public. Hepworth's work attributed to Preece was exhibited in London at the Royal Academy of Arts, the Warren Gallery, Maddox Street, in 1928 and the Lefevre Gallery, King Street, in 1936. Some of the paintings were purchased by Kenneth Clark, Virginia Woolf and Augustus John, among others. Until 1996, it was believed that the two collaborated on many of the works. Evidence for Hepworth's creating them herself comes from diaries that the two shared, where Preece admits to having had little hand in the creation of the paintings.

== Later life and death ==
Hepworth and Preece maintained their relationship after Preece's 1937 marriage to the painter Stanley Spencer, who was obsessed with Preece. Preece took Hepworth on the honeymoon, while Spencer stayed at home working on a painting. Preece and Hepworth continued to live together during the marriage to Spencer, and after Preece gained control of Spencer's finances they evicted him from his house in 1938 to rent it out. Preece refused to divorce her hapless husband. Hepworth remained Preece's companion and lover until the latter's death in 1966 at the age of 72.

Hepworth continued to paint and still signed her work as Preece until her own death in 1978. In her will Hepworth left £32,268. Hepworth and Preece (as Vivian Spencer) are buried in Cookham churchyard beneath a common memorial (pictured).
