= Hilda Carline =

British painter (1889–1950)

- Born: Hilda Anne Carline; 20 November 1889
- Died: 1 November 1950 (aged 60); Hampstead, London, England
- Resting place: Cookham Parish Cemetery, Berkshire; 51°32′54″N 0°43′38″W
- Education: George Francis Carline, Percyval Tudor-Hart, Slade School of Art
- Known for: Painting
- Spouse: Stanley Spencer
- Children: Unity Spencer

Hilda Anne Carline (20 November 1889–1 November 1950) was a British painter, daughter of the artist George Francis Carline, and first wife of the artist Stanley Spencer. She studied art under the Post-Impressionist Percyval Tudor-Hart, with her brothers Sydney and Richard, and then at the Slade School of Art under Henry Tonks. She had a promising early start with her works being shown at the London Group, Royal Academy and New English Art Club.

In 1925 she married fellow artist Stanley Spencer with whom she had what has been described as "the most bizarre domestic soap opera in the history of British art." During the time that Carline lived with Spencer she rarely painted and it was not until they separated that she began painting more frequently. Carline's physical and mental health was poor starting several years after her divorce and after 1937 she lived with family members. Spencer became obsessed with his ex-wife with whom he corresponded and painted. In her later years she made religious works with pastels. She died in 1950, having struggled for several years with breast cancer. A touring exhibition of her works, The Art of Hilda Carline: Mrs. Stanley Spencer, was held in 1999.

== Early life ==
Hilda Anne Carline was born on 20 November 1889 to the artist George Francis Carline and Annie Smith Carline, who had been adopted by a relative and never knew her mother or father, John Smith.

Carline was one of five children born to the family. Of her brothers, Richard and Sydney became artists, and George chose another career. The family moved many times when she was a child. She lived in London until 1892 when the family moved to Oxford. After that, they lived in Switzerland, then back in England in Derbyshire before returning to Oxford.

== Adulthood ==
=== Education and World War I service ===
George Carline taught his daughter to paint until October 1913, when she enrolled in the school that Percyval Tudor-Hart had established in Hampstead. Prior to that, Tudor-Hart had a school in Paris where her brothers Sydney and Richard had studied. Now, Sydney, Richard, and Hilda lived and studied together, sharing their opinions about art. Hilda focused on making watercolour paintings and sketching. Tudor-Hart, a Post-Impressionist who was an early proponent of colour theories of Wassily Kandinsky, introduced them to avant-garde continental art that was "expressive, bold, abstract and 'primitive.'"

From 1916 to 1918 Hilda did farm work for the Women's Land Army near Wangford, Suffolk. (Note: During World War I, Sydney was a pilot and then a war artist. Richard joined the war effort after his brother and also became a war artist.) She made Return from the Farm, in a Gauguinesque the style that reflected her connection to and appreciation for the countryside. After the war, she enrolled at the Slade School of Art, where she studied part-time for over five years. Under Henry Tonks, Carline studied line and formalism, which was different from the instruction she received from Tudor-Hart. She was able to leverage what she learned from Tudor-Hart to make works that were nearly abstract landscapes, and she also made refined landscapes and figures from Tonk's instruction. She earned prizes for her drawings and paintings. In the early 1920s, Hilda participated in the gatherings of artists and intellectuals – including Stanley Spencer, John and Paul Nash. (Note: Others who met at the Carline's Downshire Hill house and nearby studio were Stanley's brother, Gilbert, Mark Gertler, Charles Ginner, Christopher Nevinson.) – they met at her family's house on Downshire Hill in Hampstead. Henry Lamb called them "cercle pan-artisque of Downshire Hill." She and her brothers exhibited at the London Group, Hilda in 1921. She also exhibited at the New English Art Club and the Royal Academy.

=== Marriage ===
In December 1919, she met Stanley Spencer. He liked the fact that she was a devout Christian Scientist, talented, imaginative and striking. Spencer said of her: "I felt she had the same mental attitude to things as I had. I saw myself in that extraordinary person. I saw life with her."

The Carline family travelled for painting retreats and Stanley Spencer accompanied them on the 1920 Seaford, Sussex, 1922 Yugoslavia and 1924 Essex and Suffolk trips. Spencer and Hilda Carline often painted landscapes side-by-side, making similar works. He proposed to her six times before they were married, Spencer got cold feet and called the wedding off, only to ask her again. They were married quietly on 23 February 1925 and lived in the Vale of Health Hotel, near Hampstead Heath. A shared studio was established at the Vale of Health. In 1927 they moved to Hampshire and by 1931 they were living in Burghclere, Hampshire.

They had two daughters, Shirin (born 1925) and Unity (born 1930). While the girls were young Carline was unable to paint much, needing to tend to them and household duties. Her self-confidence waned during her marriage to Spencer. He was a man of "idiosyncratic vision, unassailable conviction, egocentricity, and brilliance." They could both be stubborn and argumentative. Richard Carline's wife, the artist Nancy Carline, contended that Spencer was frustrated by Hilda's lack of time to devote to paintings and housekeeping, and felt the time she spent gardening and sewing was unnecessary. Although Carline was not painting, she was the subject of several of Spencer's works, the drawings Hilda Nude and Hilda with Hair Down. She made Stanley Nude, which is similar in composition to the sketch Spencer made of her. All three were made in 1931 and ended the first period of works made of Hilda.

Spencer and Carline moved in 1932 to Cookham and bought a large house called Lindworth. Spencer pursued a relationship with Patricia Preece, a neighbour, who had a lesbian lover, Dorothy Hepworth. Preece's actions were like that of a con-artist. Both women were artists, but Preece signed and exhibited Hepworth's works as if they were hers. (Note: John Henshall wrote in Wife of Cookham: This trickery even led Augustus John to declare that Preece was one of England's six best living woman painters, better even than his sister Gwen. Preece made ostensibly enthusiastic overtures to Spencer, who, evidently something of a naif, was taken in.) In 1932 Carline made only two paintings, which journalist John Henshall attributed to depression.

From 1932, Carline and Spencer became increasingly independent of each other, and Spencer began painting and drawing Preece. Although he faltered on his obligations to provide support for Hilda and the girls, Spencer bought Preece gifts, including jewellery. "Hilda later wrote that Patricia was interested in Spencer for his money (he did indeed spend recklessly on her) and 'set about to procure him, trying to keep the road clear to get rid of him when she wanted to. . . She vamped him to a degree unbelievable. . . If he went to her house, she always received him half or quarter dressed.'"

By the mid-1930s the couple were living apart, their daughter Shirin was sent to live with a relative, and two of her brothers had died. Throughout the emotional crisis, her sister-in-law, Nancy Carline (wife of Richard) said that painting was therapeutic for her. One of the works, Lady in Green, was made of Preece, and she travelled to Cookham to make the painting. Carline and Spencer were divorced in May 1937, and Preece and Spencer were married the next week. The marriage was not consummated, they never lived together and Preece had him evicted from the house in 1938 after he had signed over his financial business and house to her. Spencer then lived in Hampstead in a single room. From 1937 onward, Carline and the girls lived with family members including her mother that year. Subsequently, there began a decline in Carline's mental health.

Spencer began visiting his ex-wife regularly after his relationship with Preece ended, (Note: It was easier for Stanley to maintain a relationship with Carline once they were no longer cohabiting. He was still inspired by her but had also been attracted to Patricia Preece: "There was also the Patricia question. Stanley at one stage wanted them both, Hilda: domestic, thoughtful, considerate, sincere, complex, gauche, circumspect, intense; and Patricia: sophisticated, socially connected, elegant, stylish, vivid, lively, sexy, forceful, direct, superficial, teasing, opportunistic." Hershall stated that from the time of their divorce until she died, "Carline could never quite understand how Spencer could expect her to become his mistress when she had previously been his wife.") although they remained legally married. Spencer made paintings of Carline, some of which were realistic portraits and others were imaginative paintings.

=== Art ===
When she began she made daring, unique paintings. She then was immersed in what Alfred Hickling of The Guardian phrased was "the most bizarre domestic soap opera in the history of British art." She was one of the early British modernist painters and made important works and interacted with other artists in the movement. She never developed a theme or signature style, largely because of the long periods of not painting when she was married.

Carline struggled to see herself, and have others see her, as a serious artist: when she was studying with her brothers she thought she just needed some space in a hall, while her brothers had their own rooms in the studio building. When she was married she shared a small room with her youngest daughter, Unity, and her things were cramped and hard to get to. She said: "I cannot even have my paintbox about – it has to be packed away." Carline shared some space at times with her husband but did not have the time or space to paint seriously. She became an artist during the Edwardian era, when there were strict responsibilities and limitations for single and married woman. The pathos of her lot seems borne out by the self-portrait that she made not long before she married. She seems trapped, shaded under her hat, and yet slightly defiant.

Carline retained her own artistic style, like the portrait she made of Elsie, their housekeeper. (Note: Conversely, The Telegraph article, "Love's deadly cruelty," stated: "Women artists, Nancy believes, often instinctively follow their husbands' styles and Hilda was no exception. "Take the portraits they both painted of their maid Elsie. One review mistakenly attributed Hilda's picture to Spencer. Stanley himself was so impressed with Hilda's version that he kept it with him until he died.") It was a "meticulous and candid" portrayal. The quality of her work improved after her divorce. Towards the end of her life, Carline created works that expressed her devout religious beliefs using pastels.

=== Ill health and death ===
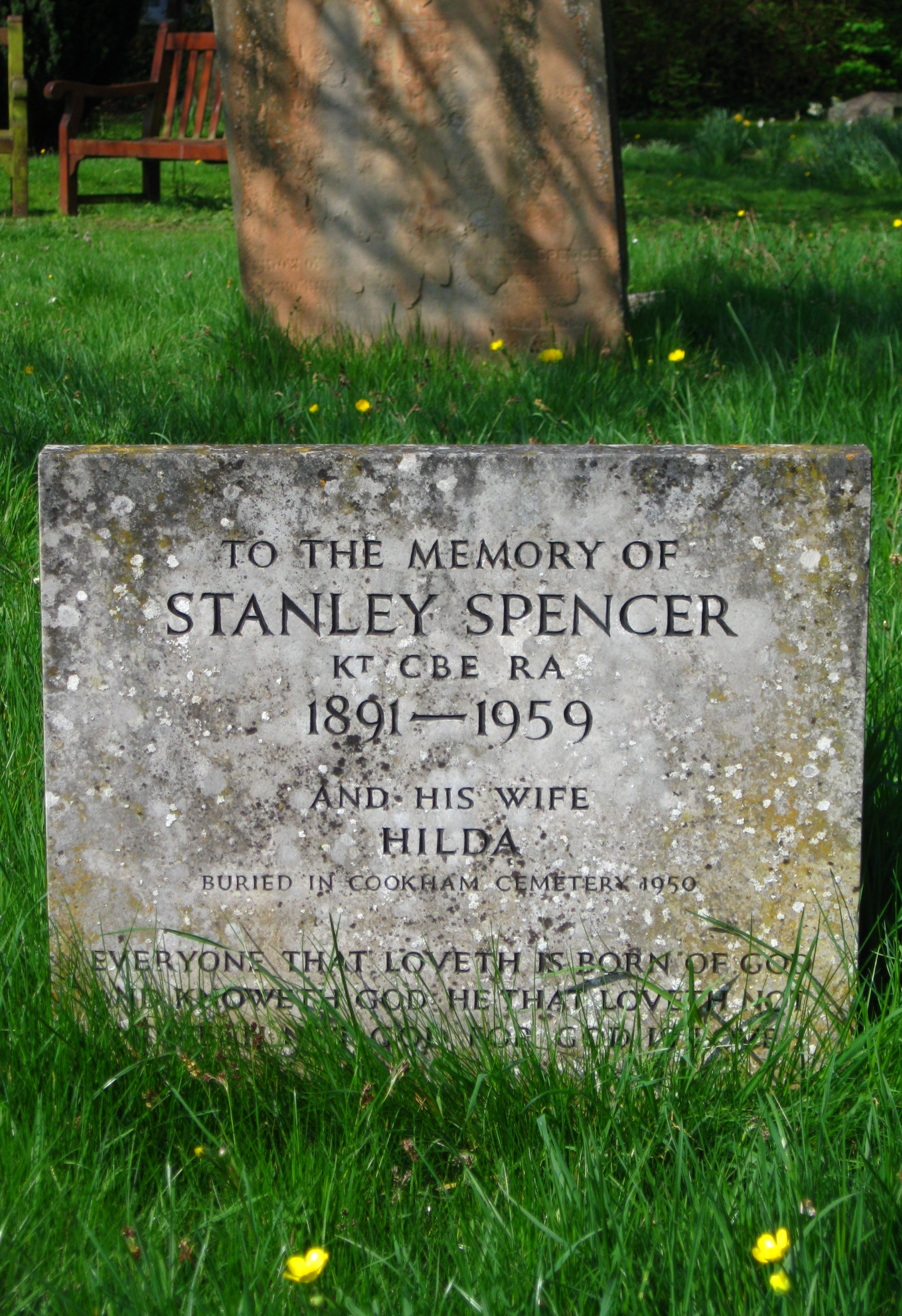
The memorial stone for Stanley Spencer and his first wife, Hilda, in Cookham churchyard

Her health began to falter in the 1940s. In 1942 she had a nervous breakdown, and was in a mental hospital for eight months, during which time she was visited every Sunday by Spencer. After their divorce, Spencer continued to be "obsessed" with her and that only increased after her breakdown. He became a prolific writer and painter. In 1947 she was diagnosed with breast cancer and had a mastectomy. On 1 November 1950 she died at Royal Free Hospital in Hampstead, where Stanley had often been at her bedside. She was buried in Cookham, Berkshire.

Spencer continued to be inspired by Hilda after her death, continuing his stream of works from his memory and writing letters to her until his death.

Carline's reputation has grown following her death. She is recognized for her talent, specifically for "her incisive portraits and atmospheric landscapes." A touring exhibition of her work entitled The Art of Hilda Spencer: Mrs. Stanley Spencer, curated by Timothy Wilcox and Alison Thomas, was conducted in 1999. It was shown at Lincoln's Usher Gallery and Kenwood House. On the 60th anniversary of Carline's death, an exhibition was held in her honour. Her daughter Shirin opened the event on 10 April 2014. The works made by Stanley Spencer of her were exhibited at the Stanley Spencer Gallery in Cookham.

== Works ==
A few of her works are:

- A fantasy, 1914
- Cliffs *
- Cookham Bridge *
- Downshire Hill Garden *
- Elsie, 1929, Brighton and Hove Museum *
- Hampstead *
- Lady in Green (Patricia Preece) *
- Portrait of the Artist's Mother, 1930, private collector*
- Return from the Farm, 1919
- Seaford, East Sussex *
- Self-Portrait, 1923, Tate
- Swans *

* Shown in the 1999 "The Art of Hilda Carline, Mrs Stanley Spencer" exhibition of her work, which was shown in Kenwood, London, Glynn Vivian Art Gallery, Swansea and York City Art Gallery.
