= Cookham Bridge =

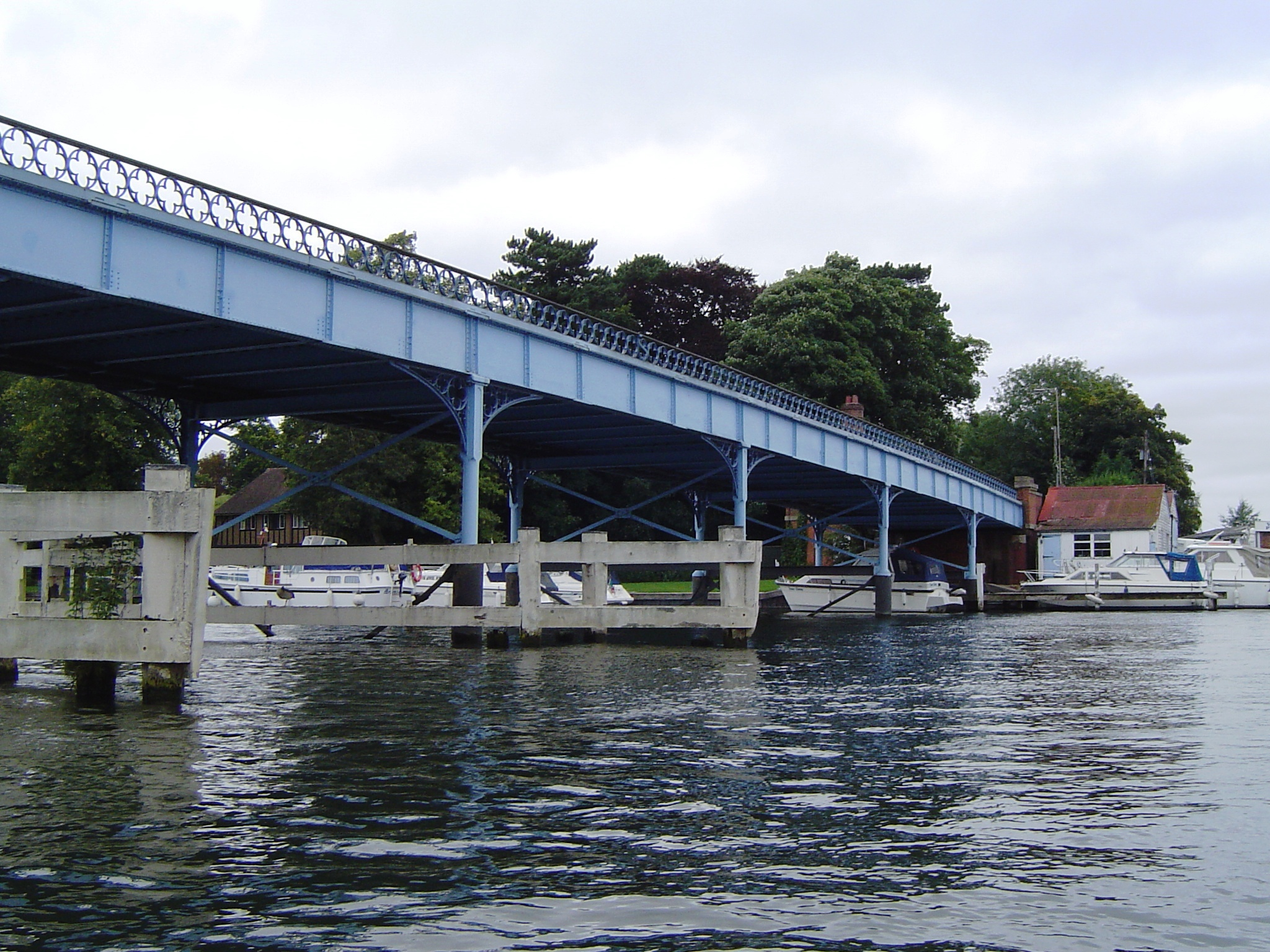
- Cookham Bridge (downstream side)
- Coordinates: 51.562355°N 0.705974°W
- Crosses: River Thames
- Locale: Cookham, Berkshire
- Official name: Cookham Bridge

Characteristics
- Design: Girder
- Material: Iron
- Height: 15 feet 2 inches (4.62 m)
- Piers in water: 6

History
- Opened: 1867

Statistics
- Toll: Abolished 1947

Location
- Interactive map of Cookham Bridge

Cookham Bridge is a road bridge in Cookham, Berkshire, carrying the A4094 road across the River Thames in England. It is on the reach above Cookham Lock and links Cookham on the Berkshire bank with Bourne End in Buckinghamshire.

Discounting a Roman bridge nearby, the bridge opened as a wooden bridge in 1840 in place of a longstanding ferry but today's iron-based structure dates from 1867. For 107 years a toll was payable – ceasing in 1947 when Berkshire County Council bought the bridge from its private owners.

The bridge has a single lane for vehicles controlled by traffic lights at each end, and pedestrian pavements. The vehicle weight limit is 7.5 tonnes, save for buses and coaches.

== Background ==
Cookham, on the south bank of the Thames has existed as a settlement for thousands of years but the first recorded river crossing there was the Camlet Way, a Roman road. This crossed at Hedsor Wharf and the remains of a Roman bridge were discovered there in the 19th century. The bridge fell into disrepair after the departure of the Romans in the early 5th century. Several ferry sites were established and even formed part of the Great West Road until the construction of Maidenhead Bridge in 1280, but it was another 1,400 years before building again a bridge at Cookham was seen as compelling.

In 1836 the newly formed Cookham Bridge Company (CBC) invited proposals for this. Isambard Kingdom Brunel, who was engaged in the building of the Great Western Railway nearby, submitted designs for a cast iron suspension bridge with an estimated cost of £20,000 (equivalent to £1,975,000 today). The CBC balked at the price tag and Brunel subsequently redesigned the scheme but only to that "which I should not be ashamed to build" with a revised cost of £10,000 (£988,000). This was still too expensive for the CBC and they decided not to proceed with Brunel.

In 1837 the Cookham Bridge Company issued a prospectus expounding the "great inconvenience and risk" of the ferry crossings and promoting the advantages of a quick and safe route over the Thames to access the Great Western Railway which was shortly to come to Maidenhead. The CBC decided to proceed with a design from George Treacher for a wooden bridge 290 ft (88 m) long and 16 ft (4.9 m) wide at an estimated cost of £2000 (£192,000). Adding a further £3000 (£288,000) for contingency the CBC received approval from Parliament in the Cookham Bridge Act 1838 (1 & 2 Vict. c. x) to charge tolls on the new bridge and to raise £5000 (£479,000) in £25 (£2,000) shares.

The owner of the ferry rights on the site of the new bridge, a Mr Poulton, was bought out by the CBC for £2,275 (£218,000) to include "one barge with chains and rollers for the carriage of cattle and one punt with poles for the conveyance of passengers". The ferry was then rented to John Beasley from 17 January 1839 for £2 4s 3d (£200) per month to allow crossing whilst bridge building was underway.

== 1840 bridge ==
Cookham Bridge as depicted by Stanley Spencer in Swan Upping at Cookham (1915-19)

On 25 May 1839 a Mr Freebody was contracted to construct the bridge for £3,140 (equivalent to £281,645) with George Treacher, the designer, as Clerk of the Works. Freebody was also contracted for a further £225 (£20,182) to build a toll house and gates on the Buckinghamshire bank. Work started in the Summer of 1839, and was finished by the end of the year, over-budget at a total cost of £4,224. The bridge was wooden and had 13 spans, nine of 24 ft (7.3 m) and four of 18 ft (5.5 m). Cookham Bridge opened on 1 January 1840 and was let to a Mr Bolton at an annual rent of £350 although by 1844 it was only producing £330pa in tolls.

Due to its wooden construction the bridge required a lot of maintenance and in 1859 George Treacher reported to the Cookham Bridge Company that several of the piles were "very much decayed and not unlikely to give way". In Treacher's opinion the bridge was unlikely to survive the winter and so a Mr Cook of Wycombe was engaged to make emergency repairs at a cost of £96 12s 2d (£10,494). The repairs did little to stem the decay and only five years later in 1864 the new surveyor, a Mr Carter, described the bridge as "not dangerous but not safe" and "may subside if a heavy vehicle passes over it". By 1866 the situation had deteriorated such that the lessee asked for a reduction in rent as the toll income had fallen off due to people being too afraid to use the bridge.

== Present structure ==
On 17 July 1866 the Cookham Bridge Company announced that a new iron bridge would be built and requested designs. 37 schemes were submitted and the contract was awarded to Messrs Pease, Hutchinson & Co Ltd of the Skerne Ironworks, Darlington for a bridge of two wrought iron girders supported by eight pairs of concrete-filled iron pillars. The estimated cost was £2,520 (equivalent to £259,343), some £1000 cheaper even than the estimate for the 1840 wooden construction. The remarkably low cost, due to Pease & Hutchinson being major iron manufacturers and prolific bridge builders, led to the new bridge being known as "the cheapest bridge on the River for its size".

Work on the replacement bridge began on 30 November 1866. The old bridge was demolished on 6 May 1867 and the approaches rerouted ready for the new bridge opening on 1 July 1867. The bridge continued to be owned by the Cookham Bridge Company and operated as a toll-bridge until 1947 when it was bought out by Berkshire County Council for £30,000 (£1,014,896) and the tolls abolished.

== See also ==
- Crossings of the River Thames

Next crossing upstream	River Thames	Next crossing downstream
Bourne End Railway Bridge (railway and pedestrian)	Cookham Bridge	Taplow Bridge (pedestrian)
