= Formosa Island =

Island in the River Thames, England

Coordinates: 51.560°N 0.699°W

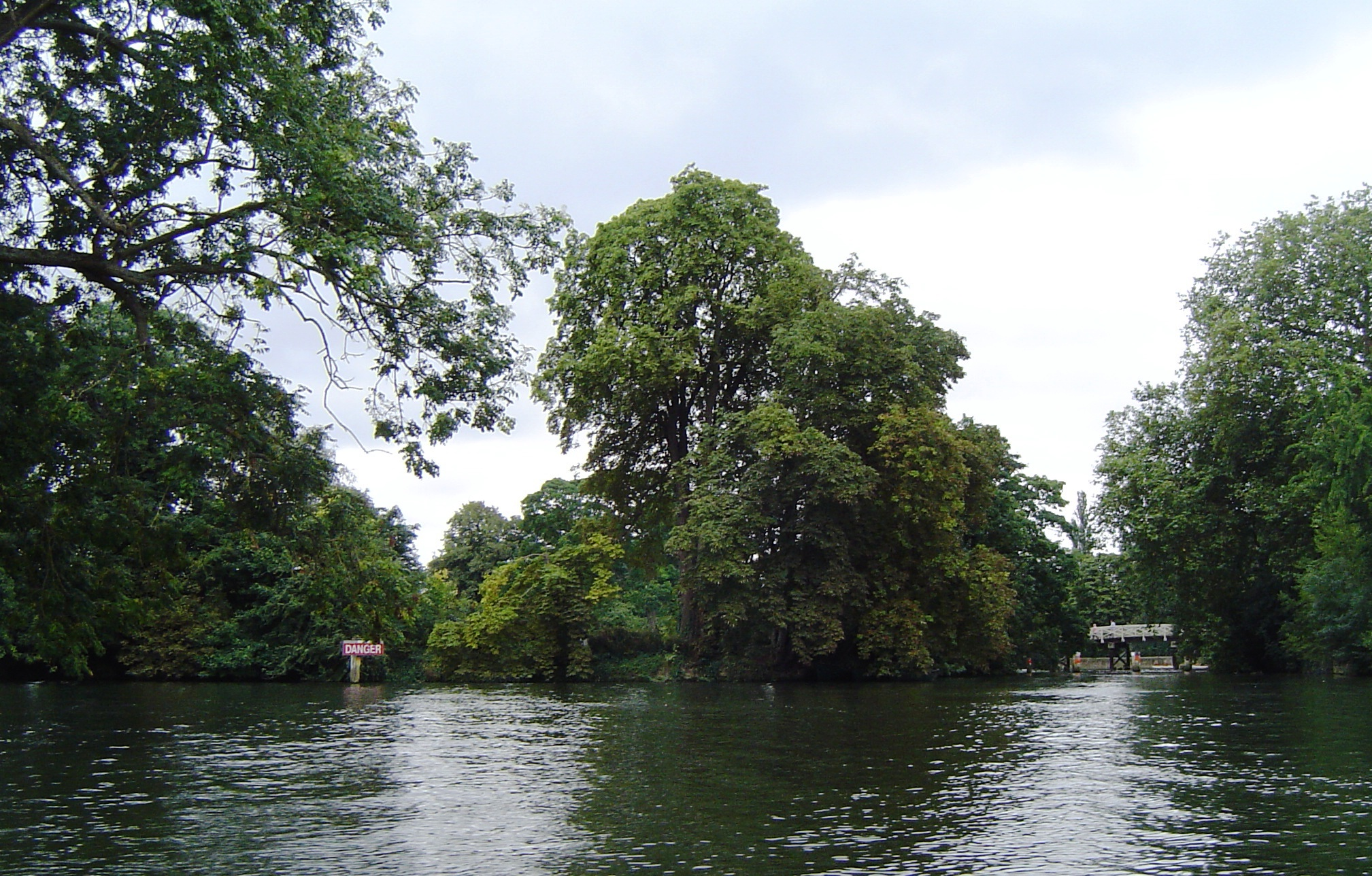
Upstream tip of Formosa Island between Odney weir stream and Cookham Mill stream

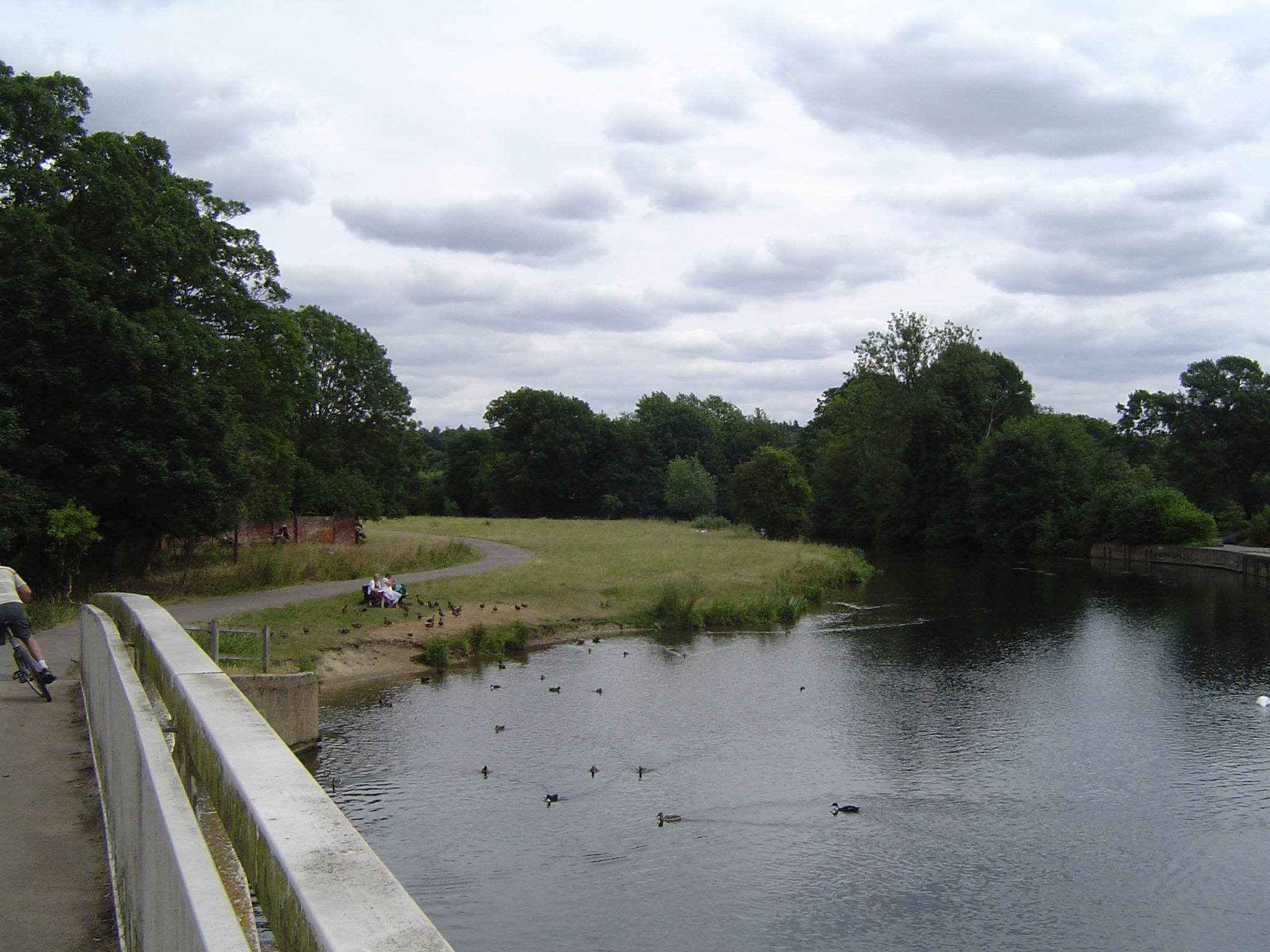
From the bridge onto Formosa Island

Formosa Island is an island in the River Thames in England at Cookham Lock near Cookham, Berkshire, with two smaller adjacent islands.

The island is one of the largest on the non-tidal river Thames with 50 acres (20 ha) of woodland. It can be reached by footbridge from Cookham. Most of the land on Formosa Island is owned by the John Lewis Partnership, and forms part of the Odney Club country club owned by the company. Formosa Island is between two of the four channels in the river at Cookham, the one closest to Cookham was once the mill stream to a paper mill at Cookham. The one on the other side leads to Odney Weir. The adjacent Mill Island has the lock channel on the other side. Beyond the lock channel is Sashes Island and the channel furthest from Cookham is Hedsor Water, the original navigation channel, which was blocked by the weir in 1830 when the lock was opened, causing loss of trade to then owner Lord Boston.

== See also ==
- Islands in the River Thames

| Next island upstream | River Thames | Next island downstream |
| Sashes Island | Formosa Island | Bavins Gulls |
