= Michael Alford =

Michael Alford may refer to:

- Michael Alford (historian) (1587–1652), English Jesuit missionary and ecclesiastical historian
- Michael Alford (artist) (born 1958), British painter
- Michael Alford (athletic director) (born 1969), American athletic director
- Mike Alford (born 1943), American football center
