= Gibraltar Islands =

Pair of islands in the River Thames in England

Coordinates: 51.570777°N 0.743382°W

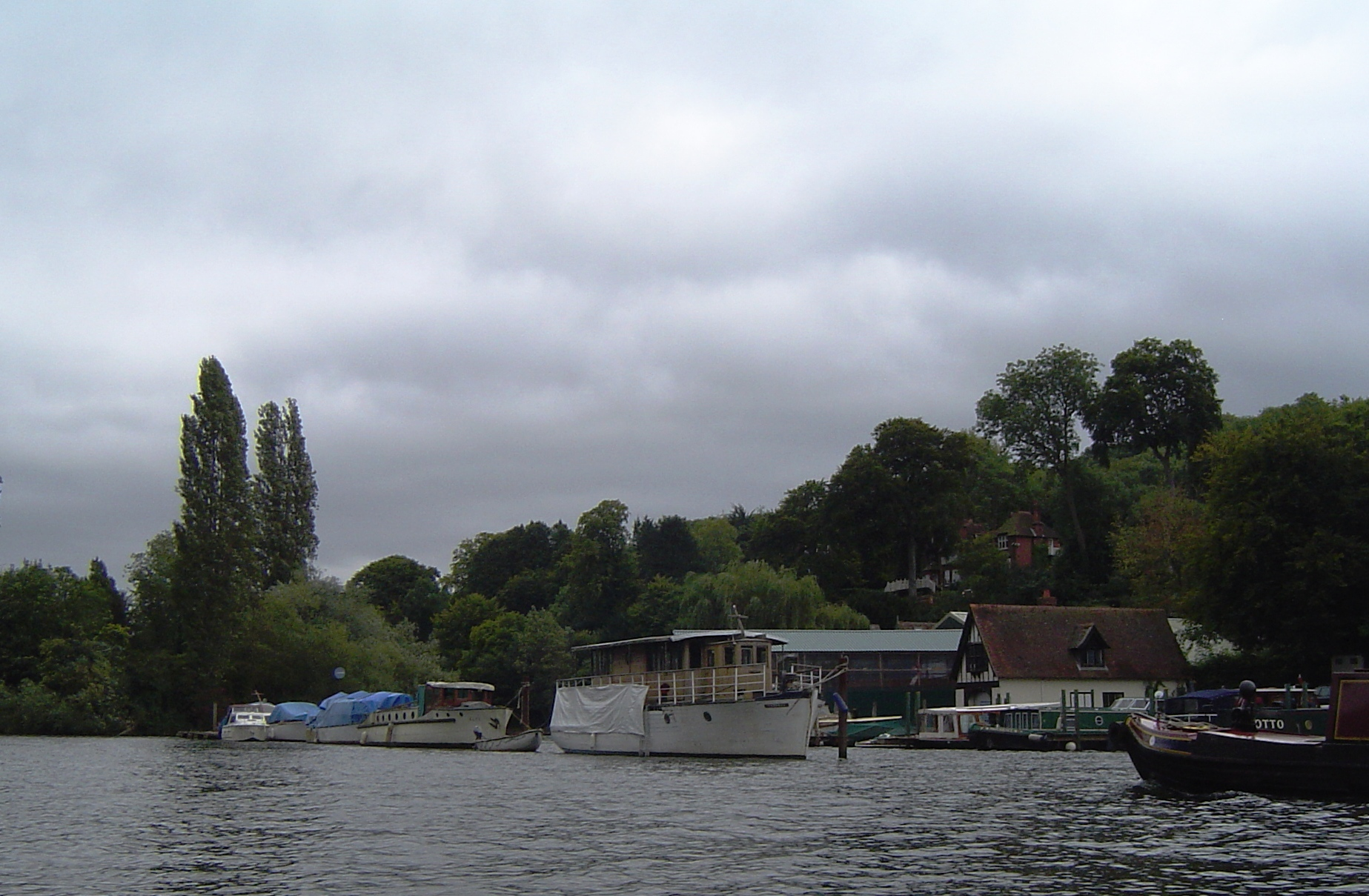
Gibraltar Islands from upstream - boats across the channel

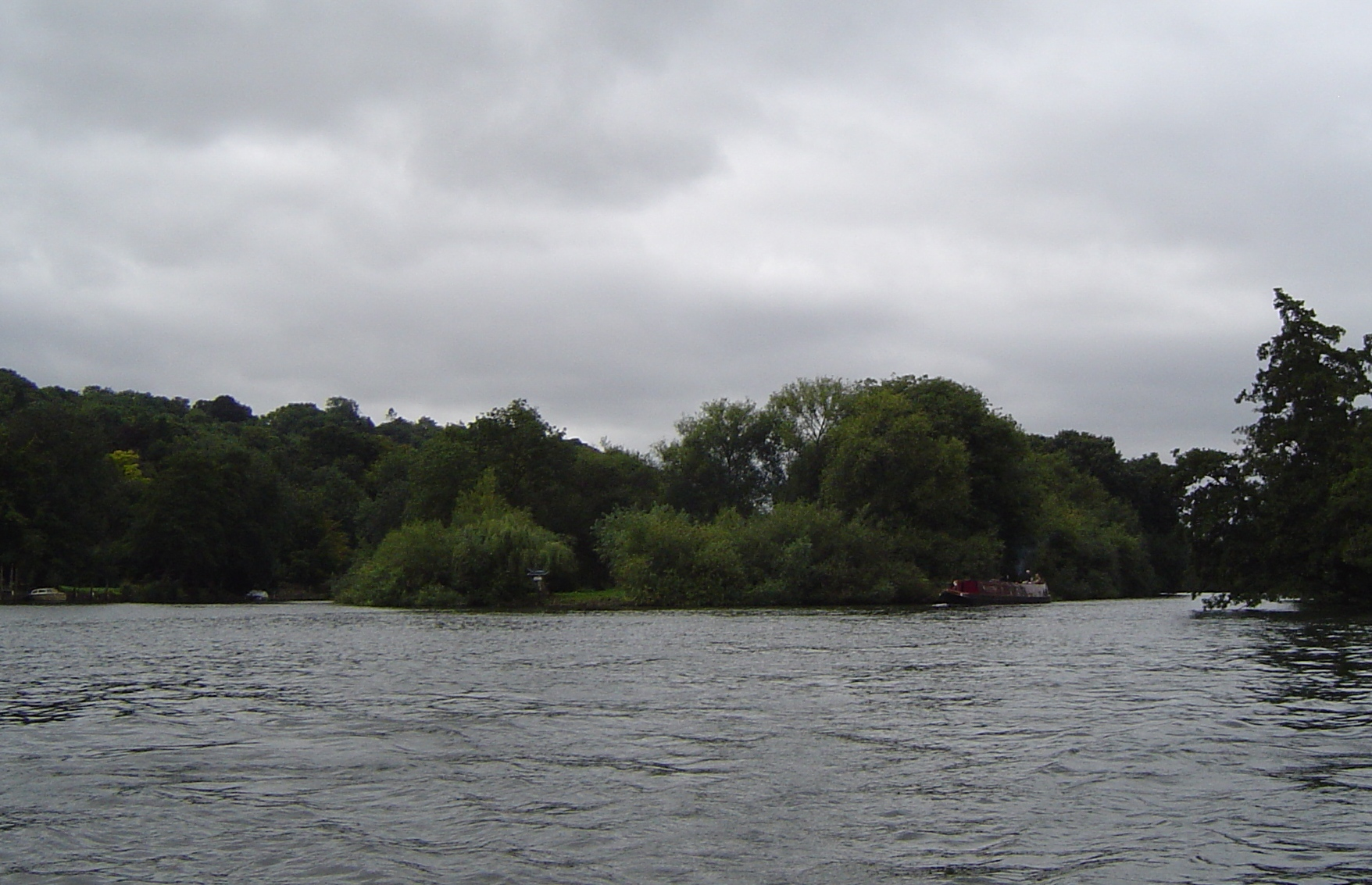
Gibraltar Islands from downstream

Gibraltar Islands are a pair of islands in the River Thames in England above Bourne End Railway Bridge on the reach above Cookham Lock, near Cookham Dean, Berkshire.

There is a footbridge to one of the islands which is closely connected to the other. Previously the islands were more numerous little aits on which osiers were grown. There are some houses on the islands. The islands are opposite Quarry Wood on the Berkshire bank which is considered to be the basis for the Wild Woods in The Wind in the Willows. The woods are also referenced by Jerome K. Jerome.

== See also ==
- Islands in the River Thames

Next island upstream	River Thames	Next island downstream
Temple Mill Island	Gibraltar Islands	Sashes Island
