= Camelot House =

House in Hadley Wood, London, England

Coordinates: 51°40′02″N 0°10′02″W

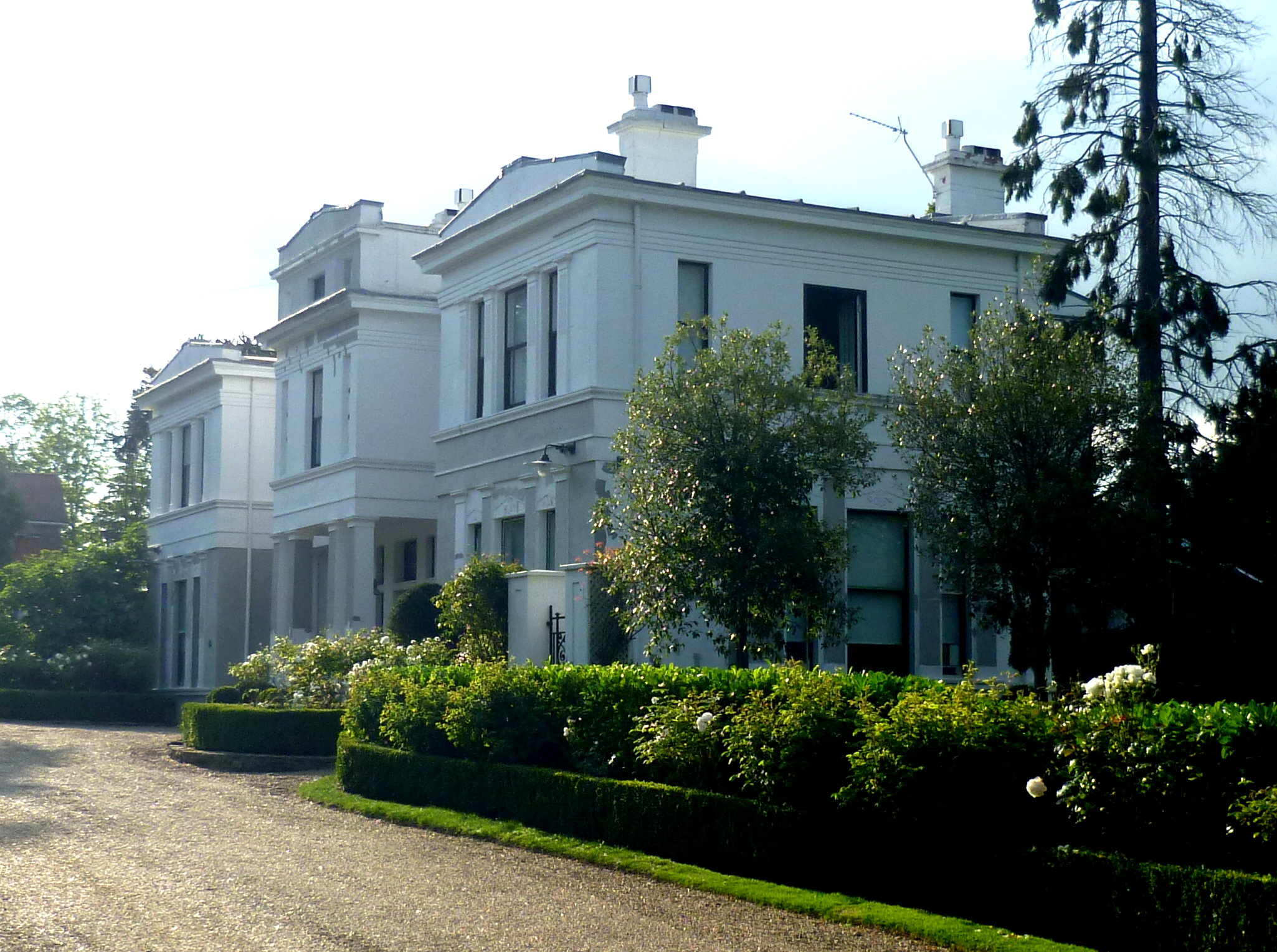
Camelot House

Camelot House is a grade II listed building at 53 Beech Hill (originally Camlet Way), Hadley Wood. The house was built around 1875–80 by the builder Frederick Lambert.

The house was also once known as Broadgates House and a Broadgates Avenue exists nearby.
