= Odney =

Common land in Berkshire, England

Coordinates: 51.560559°N 0.704824°W

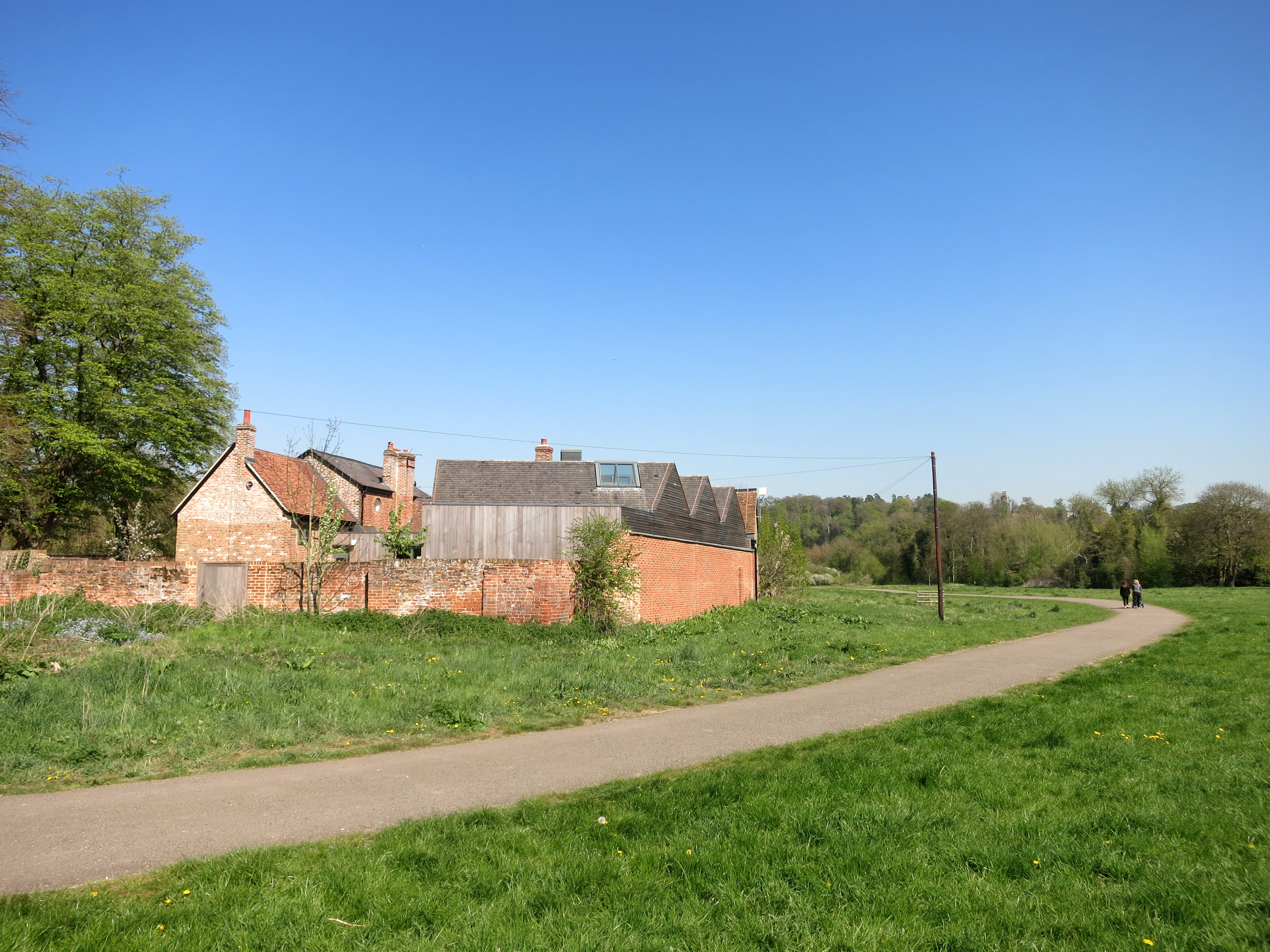
- Grove Farm and Odney Common

- Location within Berkshire
- OS grid reference: SU898854
- Metropolitan borough: Windsor and Maidenhead
- Metropolitan county: Berkshire
- Region: South East
- Country: England
- Sovereign state: United Kingdom
- Post town: MAIDENHEAD
- Postcode district: SL6
- Dialling code: 01628
- Police: Thames Valley
- Fire: Royal Berkshire
- Ambulance: South Central
- UK Parliament: Berkshire

Odney is a common in the Thames, part of the civil parish of Cookham, in the English county of Berkshire, and occupies most of the Formosa Island eyot. The island may have been sacred to the main Saxon god, Woden; the common's name originates from the Old English "Wodenes-Eye" ("Woden's Isle").

== Location ==
It lies immediately east of the village of Cookham and south of the River Thames, and is located approximately 2.5 miles (4.0 km) North of Maidenhead. It is also very close to Cookham Lock. The Cliveden Estate is directly across the Thames from Odney, and in autumn the entire valley surrounding the two estates experiences a burst in vibrant autumn colour.

== Pottery ==
There was the Odney Pottery works (1942–1956) on the common. The building can still be seen. The very attractive earthenware pottery is still sought after. John Bew was asked to set up the pottery by John Lewis in Cookham in 1942 to train disabled people. In 1948, they were given a government licence to produce domestic pottery. Geoffrey Eastop (1921–2014) spent a year working at the pottery early in his career as a potter.

== Lullebrook Manor and the Odney Club ==
The Odney Club, a hotel and conference centre owned by the John Lewis Partnership and available for the use of its Partners (staff), is centred on Lullebrook Manor.

This fine mid-18th century country house was once rented by Colonel Francis Ricardo, the first car owner in Cookham, who was High Sheriff of Berkshire in the early 1900s and supposedly the inspiration for Kenneth Grahame's Toad in the 1908 children's book The Wind in the Willows.

A property on the site is known to have existed from as early as the 13th Century, when the house was owned by the De Lullebrook family.
