= Michael Alford (artist) =

British figurative painter

Michael Robert Patrick Alford
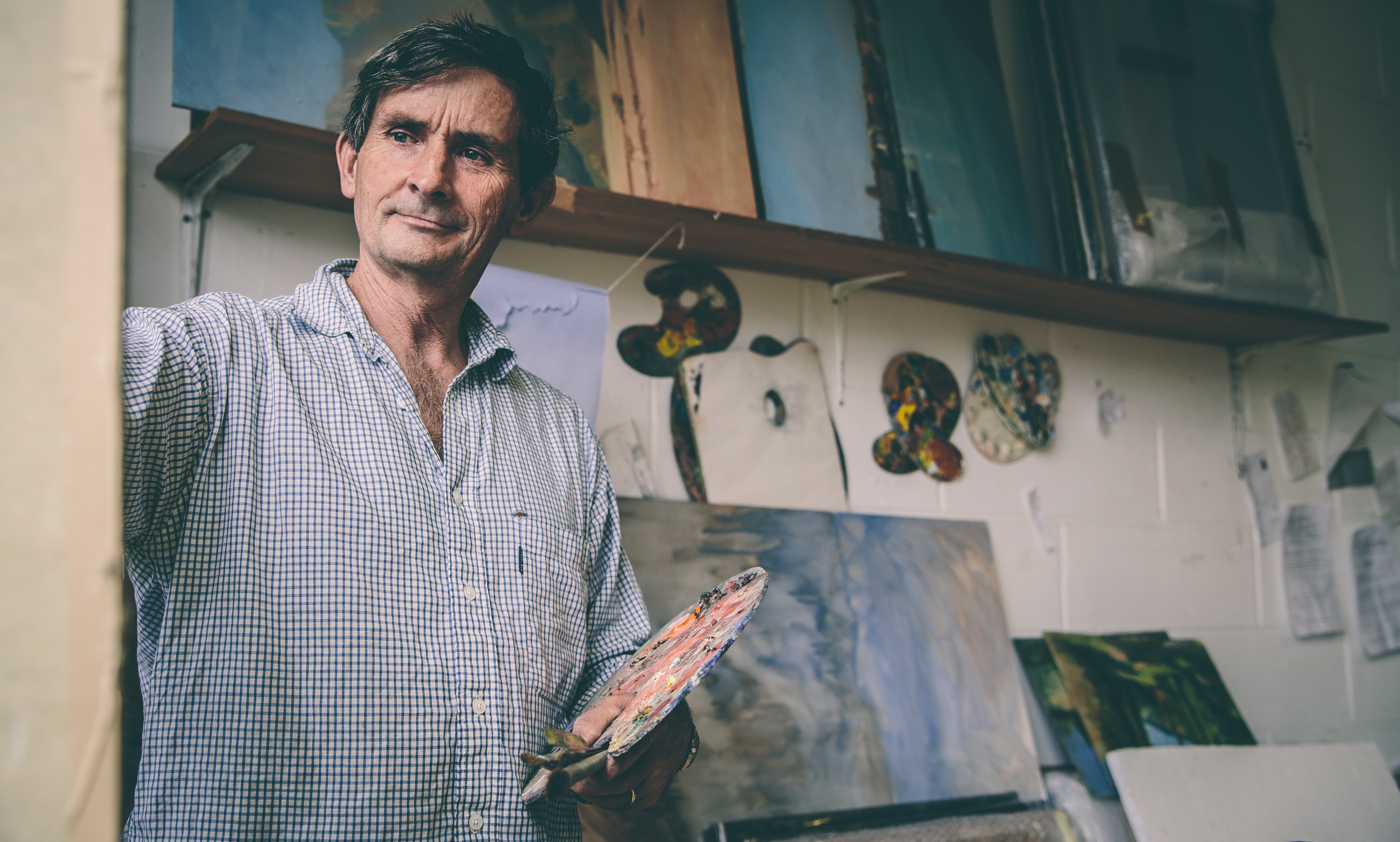
- Born: September 15, 1958 (age 67); Cookham, Berkshire, England
- Education: Dragon School; Rugby School; Durham University; Slade School of Art; Chelsea School of Art
- Known for: Figurative painting (landscapes, cityscapes, figures, portraits, nudes, murals)
- Notable work: Patrol at Pan Kalay Police Station (acquired by the National Army Museum)
- Style: Figurative
- Awards: ROI Stanley Grimm Prize – Michael Robert Patrick Alford; 2016 Agnes Reeve Memorial Prize – Michael Robert Patrick Alford; 2000 Primaluce International Trompe L'Oeil Festival – Michael Robert Patrick Alford; 2003 Third Place Prize

Michael Robert Patrick Alford (born 15 September 1958, in Cookham, Berkshire, England) is a British figurative painter whose work includes landscapes, cityscapes, figures, portraits, nudes and murals.

== Biography ==
Alford was born in Cookham, England, and grew up in England and Germany. He attended the Dragon School and later Rugby School. His first art training came from his father, an officer in the Royal Engineers, who taught him how to draw in perspective at an early age. After a period in the Royal Marines, he attended Durham University (St John's College), where he took a degree in Spanish and Arabic. Later he traveled extensively in South America and the Middle East, documenting his trips in a series of detailed sketchbooks. He received further art training at the Slade and Chelsea schools of art before beginning his career as a muralist and fine arts painter, exhibiting widely in the UK, the US and Europe. Michael Alford lives in London but travels widely seeking new subjects.

In his twenties, Alford began painting large-scale murals and trompe l’oeil works, which he has described as his most thorough introduction to the practicalities of painting as distinct from drawing.

Alford is particularly noted for his cityscapes, especially of London. He is interested in the changing nature of urban spaces and in the visual juxtapositions of classical, medieval, and modern architecture.

== Career ==
Alford exhibits work in group and solo shows in galleries including Wimbledon Fine Arts; Panter and Hall Galleries; Chloe Gallery, San Francisco, Mall Galleries with the Royal Institute of Oil Painters, and Duncan Campbell Fine Art. Alford's works are also presented by online gallery Singulart, and Artsy.

Alford has been an official War Artist to the British Military on three occasions. In 2010, he accompanied the Grenadier Guards to Afghanistan, where he created a series of watercolors based on his experience in the field. He donated the collection to the Colonel's Fund, the Grenadier Guards' charity for wounded Guards, their families, and the families of Guards killed in action His painting, Patrol at Pan Kalay Police Station, 2016, was acquired by the National Army Museum.

Alford's works are in corporate holdings including Berkeley Square Gallery; Hill & Knowlton; Sheraton Hotel, Amsterdam; Claridges; and Trust House Forte.

Michael was a council member of the Chelsea Art Society from 2011 to 2017. In 2017, he was a semi-finalist in Sky Arts Landscape Artist of the Year.

He is the recipient of the Chelsea Society Prize for painting (2025), the William Sloane Medal (with Louise Diggle, 2024), ROI Stanley Grimm Prize (2016), the Agnes Reeve Memorial Prize (2000), and the Primaluce International Trompe L'Oeil Festival Third Place Prize (2003).
