= Stanley Spencer Gallery =

Art museum in Cookham, Berkshire, England

Coordinates: 51.5597°N 0.7073°W

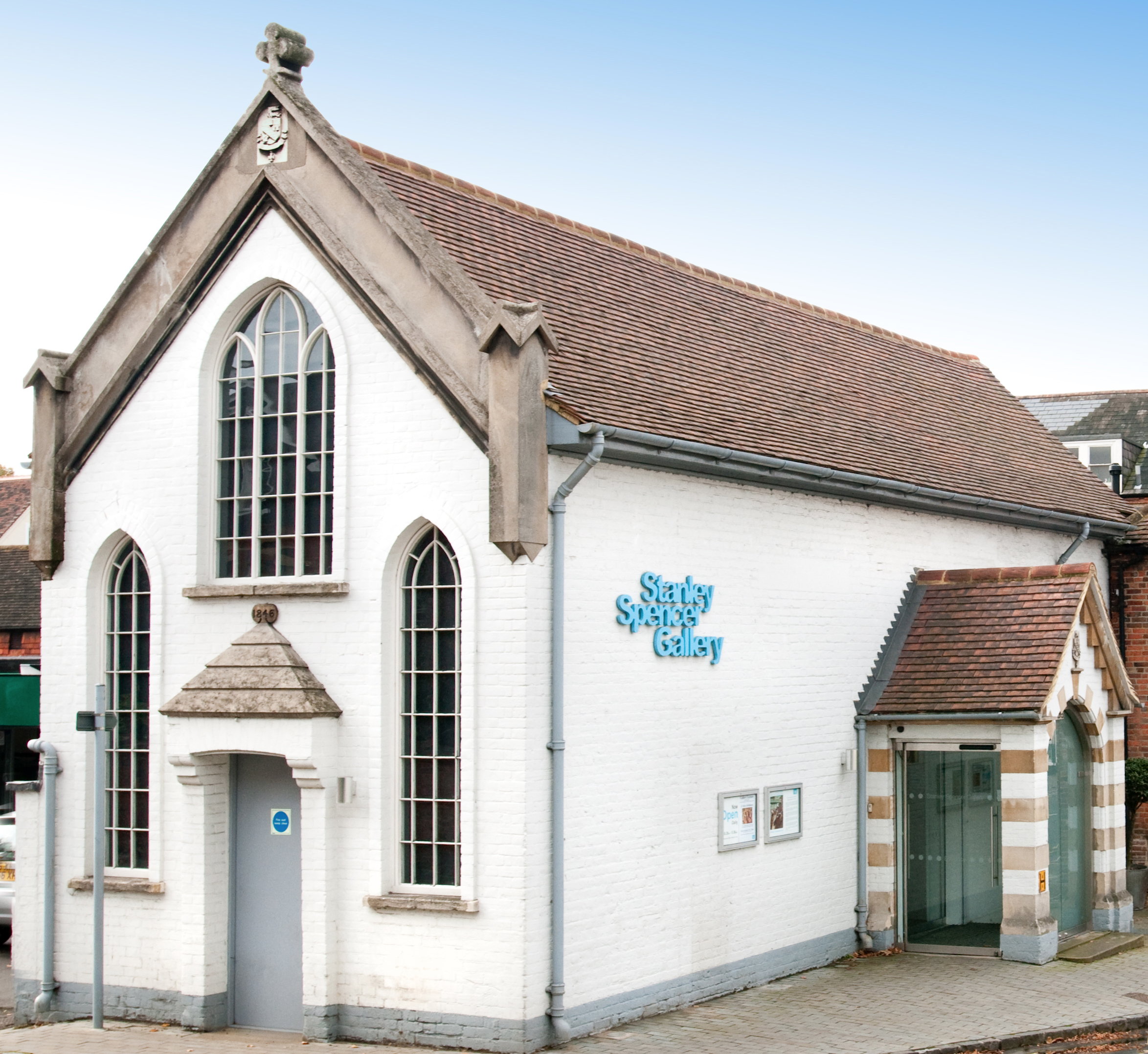
Stanley Spencer Gallery, Cookham, Berkshire, UK

The Stanley Spencer Gallery is an art museum in the South of England dedicated to the life and work of the artist Stanley Spencer. It was opened in 1962 and is located in the Thameside village of Cookham, Berkshire, where the artist was born and spent much of his life. The gallery's collection comprises over 100 paintings and drawings, which includes a number of long-term loans. Exhibitions are mounted on a regular basis and include loans from other public institutions and public collections.

== The history ==
Cookham was very important to Stanley Spencer, he called it ‘a Village in Heaven’ and it was an endless source of artistic inspiration throughout his life. After his death in 1959 friends and patrons determined to find a permanent home within the village in which to display paintings and drawings that would serve as a memorial to the artist. Those involved in the project included Joan George, who lived for a time in the artist's former house Fernlea and became the first honorary secretary; Gerard Shiel, a solicitor and local collector of Spencer's works; Donald Rademacher, a former director of the John Lewis Partnership; and the Rev Michael Westropp, vicar of Cookham who had extended hospitality to Spencer in his last years. In 1962 the Gallery opened within the former Wesleyan Chapel in the High Street which Spencer had attended as a child with his mother. In the catalogue for the opening exhibition, Lord Astor, a patron of Spencer and founder of the Gallery wrote:

This Gallery is in its nature modest. It can only show a selection of Stanley Spencer’s pictures though they will vary each year. But perhaps a great edifice would be less typical of Stanley than this Gallery which is in scale with the rest of the village and reflects the nature of Stanley; small, cheerful, very special and deeply loved.

On show were many lent works, a number of which now form part of the permanent collection, including the monumental painting Christ Preaching at Cookham Regatta, left unfinished at Spencer's death. The practical arrangements of the hanging were supervised by Spencer's former agent Dudley Tooth. The artist's daughters Shirin and Unity attended the exhibition and have been great supporters of the Gallery over the years. The Gallery was then opened to the public, at first run by a full-time paid custodian but latterly run at every level very successfully by a team of volunteers.

== The building ==
The Wesleyan Methodist chapel on Cookham High Street was built in 1846. A simple structure of brick and slate, it could accommodate a congregation of up to 107. Stanley Spencer attended the chapel with his mother whose brother had been a local preacher there. The services made a deep impression upon the young artist and he felt a great spiritual significance within the little building, so much so that over thirty years later he was able to recall it in great detail when drawing Ecstasy in a Wesleyan Chapel which is now in the Gallery's collection.

The chapel became underused once a larger Wesleyan Methodist Church was built in nearby Cookham Rise in 1904 and eventually closed, much to the chagrin of the Spencer family who fought hard to keep it open. Stanley's brother Gilbert Spencer recalled:

On 17 April 1910 Stan and I saw the key turned in the door of Cookham Chapel for the last time after the evening service. And with this, I think an important and significant influence in my brother's life came to an end.

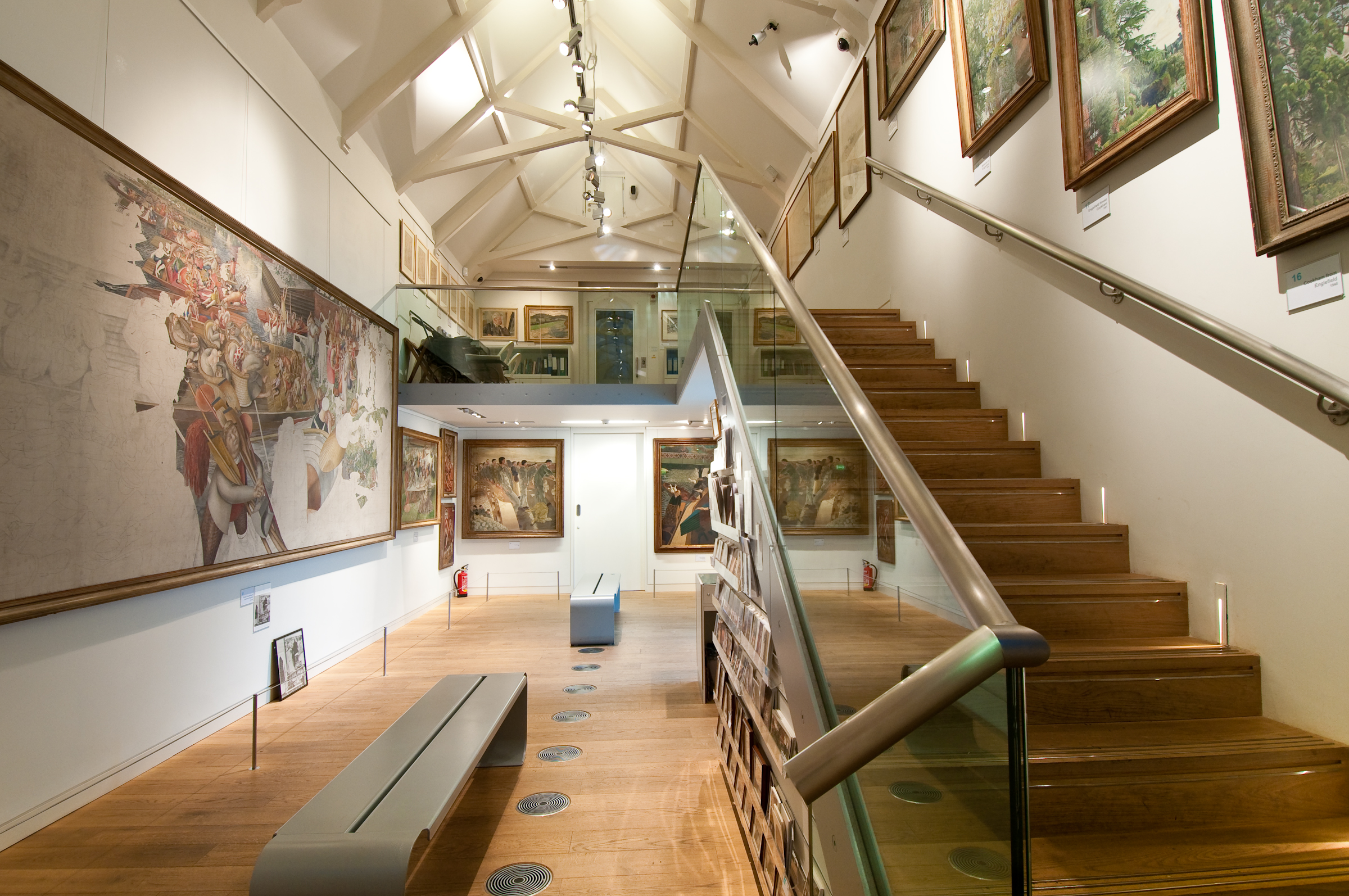
The interior of the gallery, refurbished in 2006

The building was then converted by local benefactor Colonel Ricardo into the "King's Hall", a reading and recreation room for village residents, and continued as such until the Second World War, after which it was used for various activities, including a life drawing class suggested by Stanley Spencer. After Spencer's death in 1959 Faith Gibbon, a young artist whom he had befriended, was using the former chapel as a studio. She invited the steering committee of the newly founded Stanley Spencer Memorial Trust to visit her, at which point it was decided that the perfect venue for The Stanley Spencer Gallery had been found. A simple conversion took place; the side windows were blocked in to allow more hanging space and a new floor, doors and lights were installed.

In 2006/7 the building was completely refurbished at a cost of over £800,000 thanks to the Heritage Lottery Fund and was reopened on 29 September 2007, creating a modern, light space which displays Spencer's works to their best advantage. A mezzanine floor was added and new state of the art equipment installed in a sympathetic renovation which reclaims the simple beauty of the building which Spencer so loved.

== Spencer's Cookham ==
Spencer was born at Fernlea on Cookham High Street on 30 June 1891, the tenth of 11 children in the family. The house had been built by his grandfather, Master Builder Julius, who was also responsible for the local school and many other houses around the village.

Cookham, prior to the First World War, was a rural community somewhat cut off from the outside world, the curve of the River Thames giving it an almost island-like isolation. The village high street contained a blacksmith, a baker, a butcher, a chemist and a working farm. At some stage all these would feature in his work.

The young Spencer was fascinated by everything he saw around him, from the cows in the barn across the road from his bedroom to the piles of rubbish mounting in the farmyard. (This was before regular rubbish collections arrived in the village.) A regular swimmer in the river, he claimed his early morning bathe, as the sunlight would hit the water ‘"was the time for visitations". His early rudimentary education, at the hands of his two sisters in a small shed in his grandmother's garden, developed his love of nature as long walks through the woods and meadows were a regular routine. Time and again he would return to the visual images of his village childhood, just one example being his 1958 Crucifixion which was inspired by seeing piles of rubble in the High Street created by the laying of the mains drainage pipes.

Cookham has altered greatly since Spencer's early days but it is still possible to see many settings of his paintings and even the views he recorded so well. Some of the village atmosphere he so enjoyed can be found walking through the churchyard of Holy Trinity or following Spencer's footsteps along the river bank up to Cockmarsh and Winter Hill.

== The collection ==
The Stanley Spencer Gallery has one of the largest collections of Stanley Spencer works in the world. It comprises 24 paintings, 66 drawings, 8 lithographs and 3 very early works in pen and ink. The heart of the collection is the Barbara Karmel bequest of 1995 which consisted of four oil paintings including one of his masterpieces, Sarah Tubb and the Heavenly Visitors (1933), and eight drawings which included some of his earliest drawings. The complete collection may be accessed online at the Gallery's website.

All aspects of the Spencer works are covered in the collection, from preparatory drawings and studies to final paintings. For example:

Preparatory Drawings and Studies

- Woolshop (The) Drawing, pencil on paper – 16in x 11in
- Sarah Tubb and the Heavenly Visitors (Study) (1933) Drawing, pencil on squared paper, 9in x 8in

Paintings

- Sarah Tubb and the Heavenly Visitors (1933) Painting, oil on canvas – 36in x 40in
- Christ Preaching at Cookham Regatta (1952–59) Painting, oil on canvas unfinished – 81in x 211in

Portraits

- Self Portrait (1923) Painting, oil on canvas – 20in x 16in
- Portrait of Mr and Mrs Baggett (1956) Painting, oil on canvas – 24in x 36in

Gardens and Landscapes

- Englefield House, Cookham (1951) Painting, oil on canvas – 30in x 20in
- Neighbours (1936) Painting, oil on canvas – 30in x 20in

"Cookham from Englefield" was stolen from the gallery in 2012. It was found by Police in a drug dealer's flat in Kingston-upon-Thames in 2017.

== The archive ==
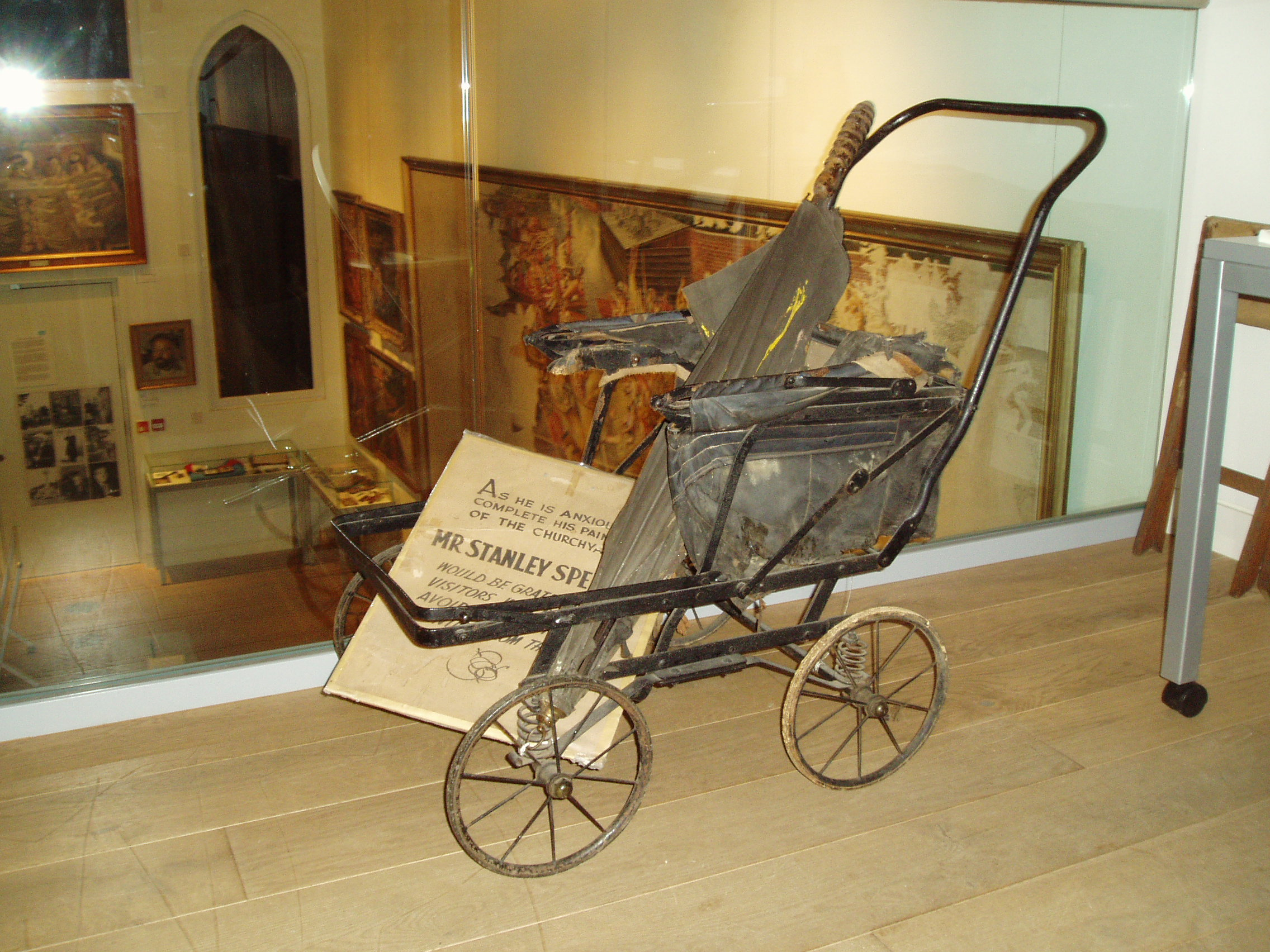
Stanley Spencer's pram

On the mezzanine floor level of the gallery is a small study area which houses library and archive material and a computer presentation about the artist and his work. A comprehensive selection of books and articles on Stanley Spencer and related topics is available to be consulted on the premises during opening hours.

Archive material on open access includes reference files of press cuttings (1920s – present day), student theses and essays, written memories of Spencer, exhibition catalogues and copies and transcripts of letters written by Stanley Spencer (including the Spencer-Chute correspondence; a full set of letters written during the First World War from Spencer to his friend the artist and poet Desmond Chute, the originals of which are in the Gallery archive).

Further archive material is available to view by appointment including sound recordings of those who knew Spencer, the research papers of Spencer's biographer Kenneth Pople and a comprehensive photograph archive. Various items of memorabilia that were owned by Stanley Spencer are on permanent display in the Gallery. Of particular interest are the pram that Spencer famously used to transport his painting equipment around the village and the delicate brushes he used for the fine detail in his later works.

== Exhibition history ==
Exhibitions are changed every six months; the summer exhibition including loaned works on a theme with the winter exhibition usually comprising a selection from the Gallery's own collection. Over the years since the gallery was founded many aspects of Spencer's art have been explored; portraits, landscapes, visionary works, places both far and near and particular periods in the artist's life. Work by his family and contemporaries have also been exhibited. (Catalogues of all previous exhibitions are available to view on the library shelves in the gallery.)

A particular highlight in recent years was The Art of Shipbuilding on the Clyde in 2011 during which the whole of the Gallery was dedicated to the large scale canvases Spencer produced during the Second World War when sent to Lithgows Shipyard, Port Glasgow, as an official war artist.

Exhibitions have included Stanley Spencer in Cookham (7 November 2013 – 30 March 2014) and Paradise Regained. Spencer in the Aftermath of the First World War (2 April – 2 November 2014); the theme of which, timed to coincide with the centenary of the First World War, was to examine the effect this momentous event had upon Stanley Spencer's art. On display were key paintings from the period through which the artist sought to regain the artistic vision he feared lost as a result of the trauma of war. Also exhibited were works and supplementary material about Spencer's wartime experiences in Macedonia and the planning of the Burghclere Chapel. The Summer Exhibition for 2025 is ‘That Marvellous Atmosphere’ (Stanley Spencer and Cookham Regatta). For "Revealing Genius, Conserving Art: Stanley Spencer's Final Masterpiece", the Winter 2025/26 exhibition, "Christ Preaching at Cookham Regatta" is displayed at eye level.

== Gallery ==
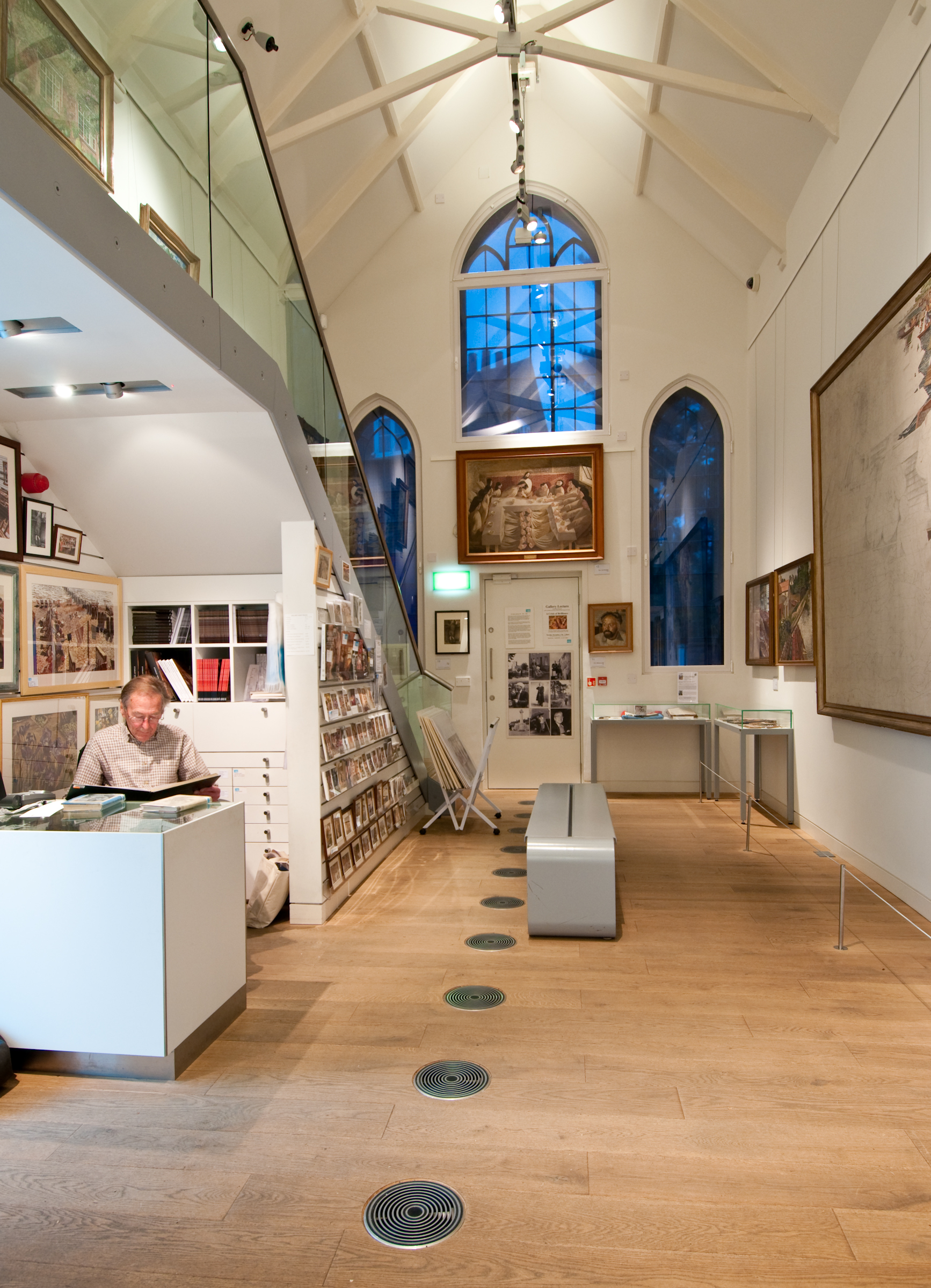
General view of the Gallery today

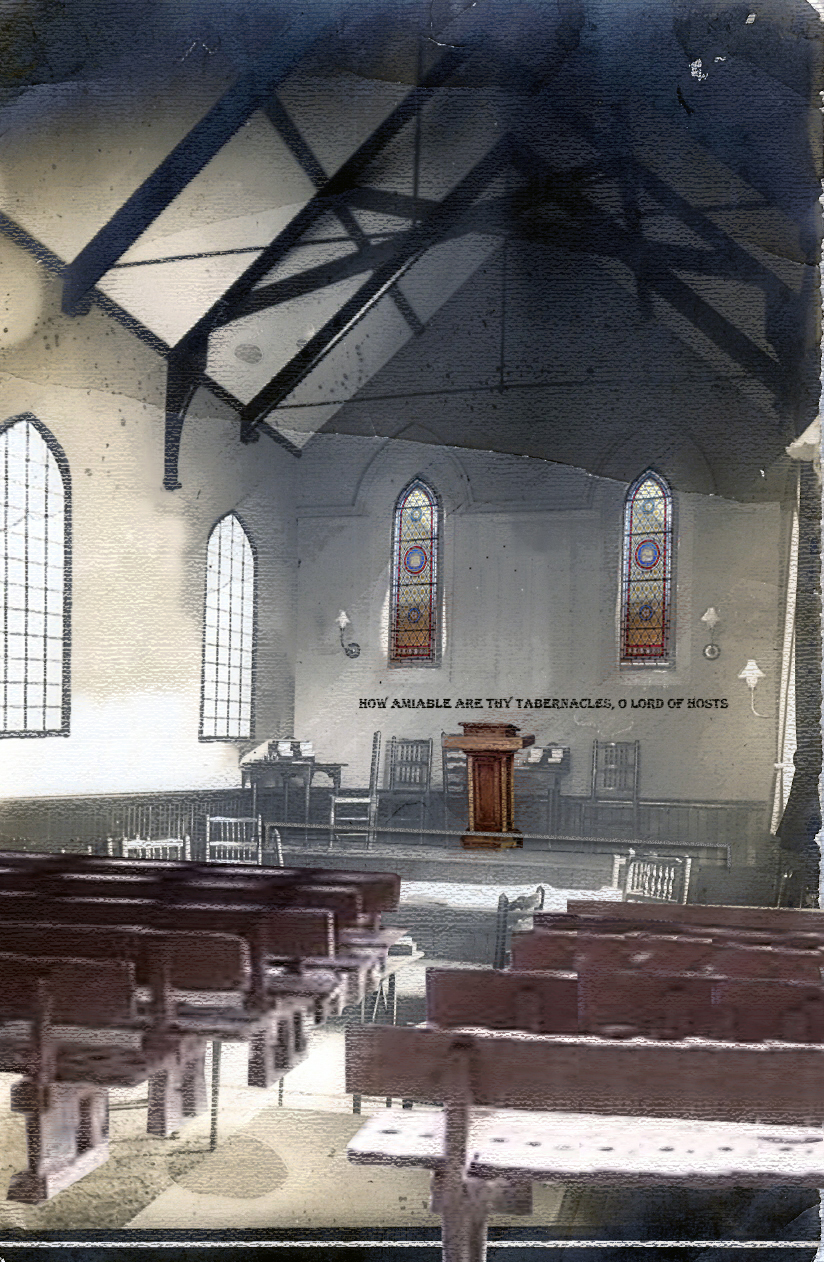
Computer impression of original interior

== See also ==
- List of single-artist museums
