= Sashes Island =

Island in the River Thames in Berkshire, England

Coordinates: 51.5639°N 0.6989°W

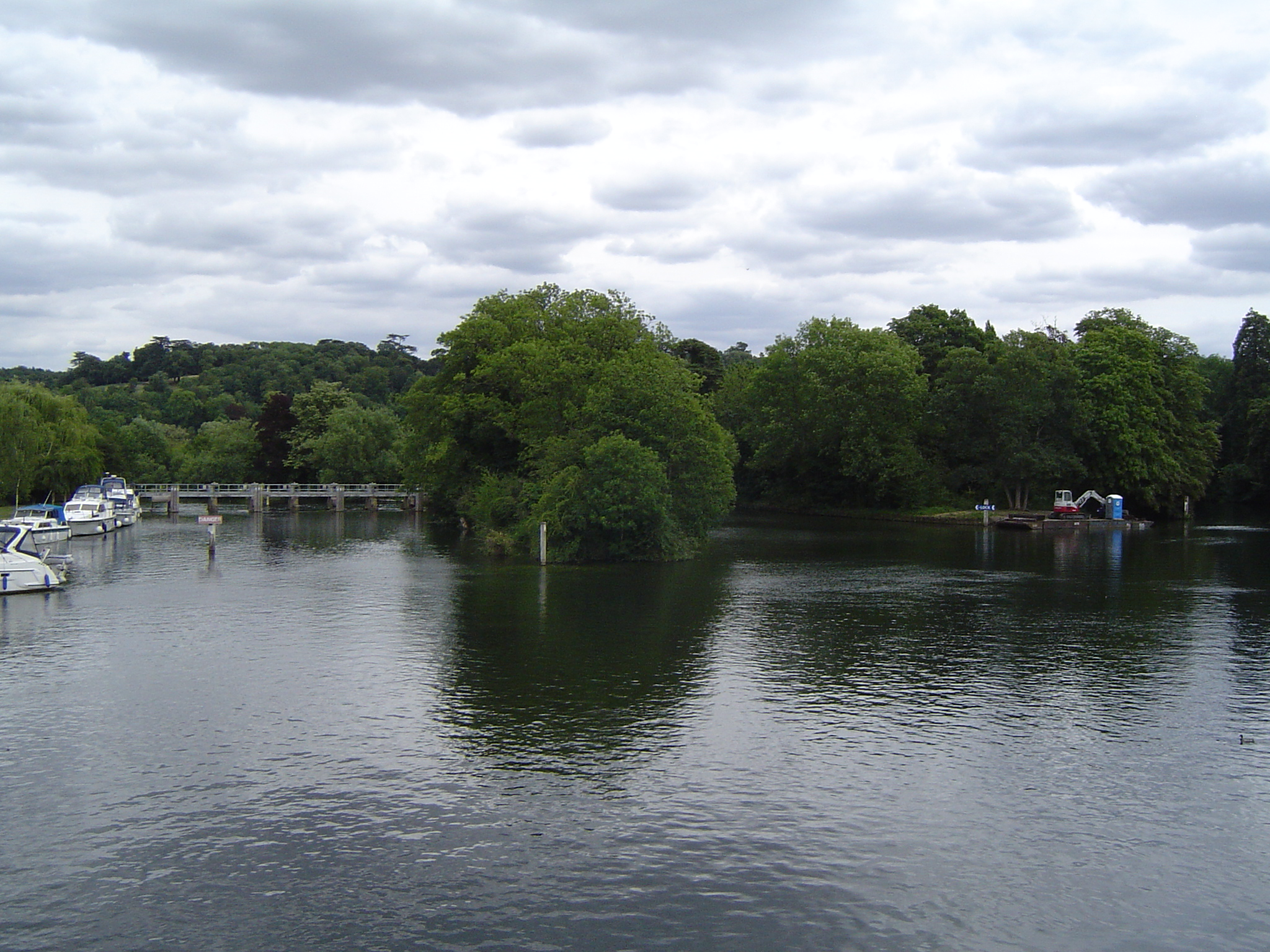
Upstream tip of Sashes Island between Hedsor Water and the lock cut.

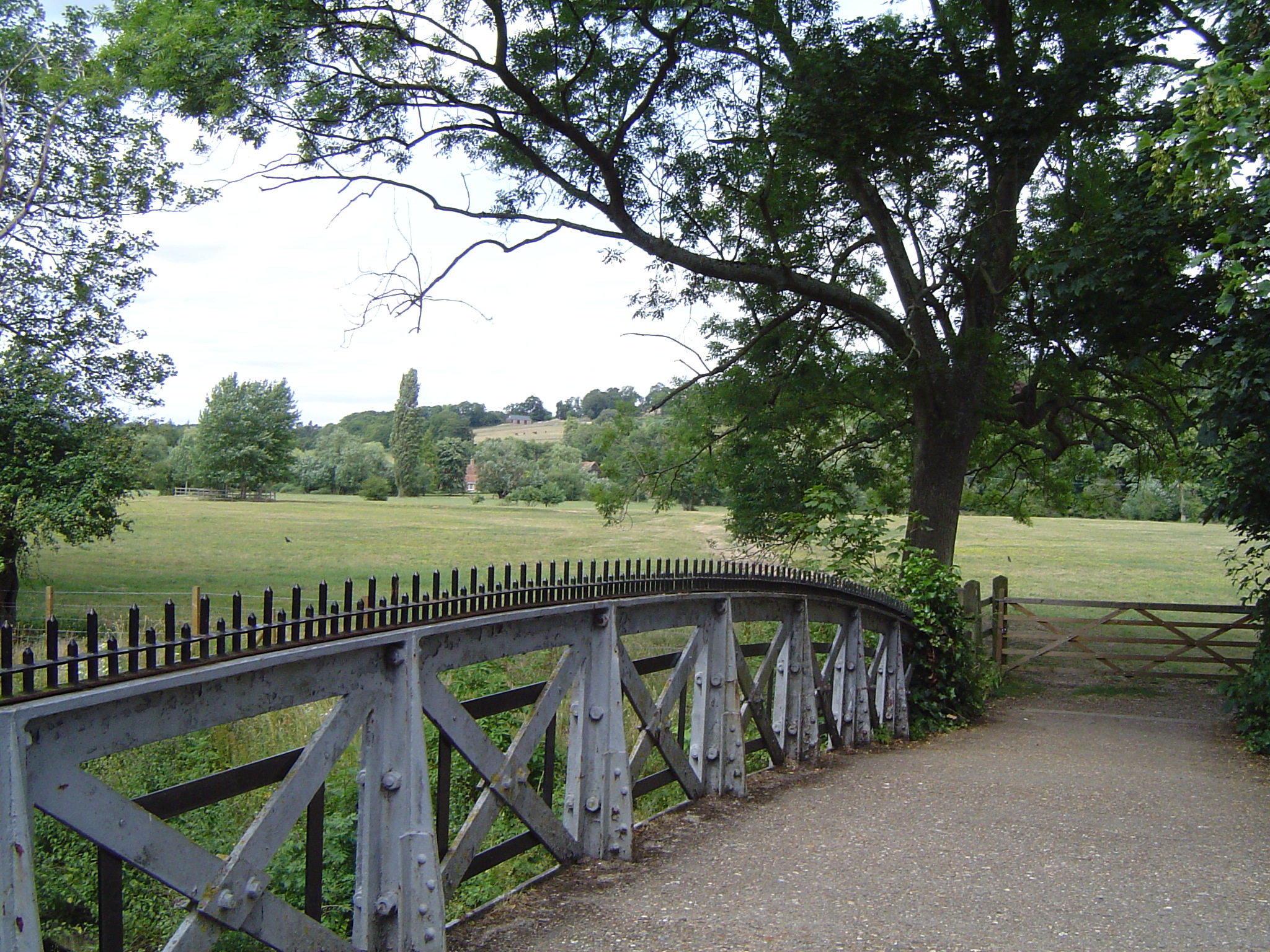
Bridge onto Sashes Island

Sashes Island is an island in the River Thames in England at Cookham Lock near Cookham, Berkshire. It is now open farmland, but has Roman and Anglo-Saxon connections.

The island is located between Hedsor Water and the present navigation channel leading to Cookham Lock. It can be reached from Cookham by footbridges across three channels of the River Thames via Formosa Island and Mill Island. Its name is derived from Sceaftesege or "Sceaf’s Isle".

== History ==
The earliest known map of the island was by Hynde, and dates from circa 1580. It shows 'Sashes stream', which cuts the island in half.

The island is believed to have been at the point where the Thames was crossed by a Roman road called Camlet Way, which ran from St. Albans to Silchester. Wooden piles and stakes were found here in the nineteenth century and again in 1969 which may indicate the remains of a substantial bridge. Cookham may derive its name from a river port here named "Cwch-ium", which in the Celtic language means "Boat-Place".

In Saxon times, Sashes Island was the site of a burh built under Alfred the Great as a defence against the Danes. It was listed in the 914 AD Burghal Hidage. The Burghal Hidage reports that the defences of "Sceaftessige" were 4,125ft long. No trace of this burh has been found, but this may be as a result of the digging of the lock cut in the 1830s, which disrupted the terrain. Late Saxon weapons have been found in the cut.

There is a landscape painting of Sashes Island by Gilbert Spencer, brother of Stanley Spencer who was born at Cookham.

== See also ==
- Islands in the River Thames

Next island upstream	River Thames	Next island downstream
Gibraltar Islands	Sashes Island	Formosa Island
