= Cookham Lock =

Lock and weirs on the River Thames in Berkshire, England

Coordinates: 51.5613°N 0.695442°W

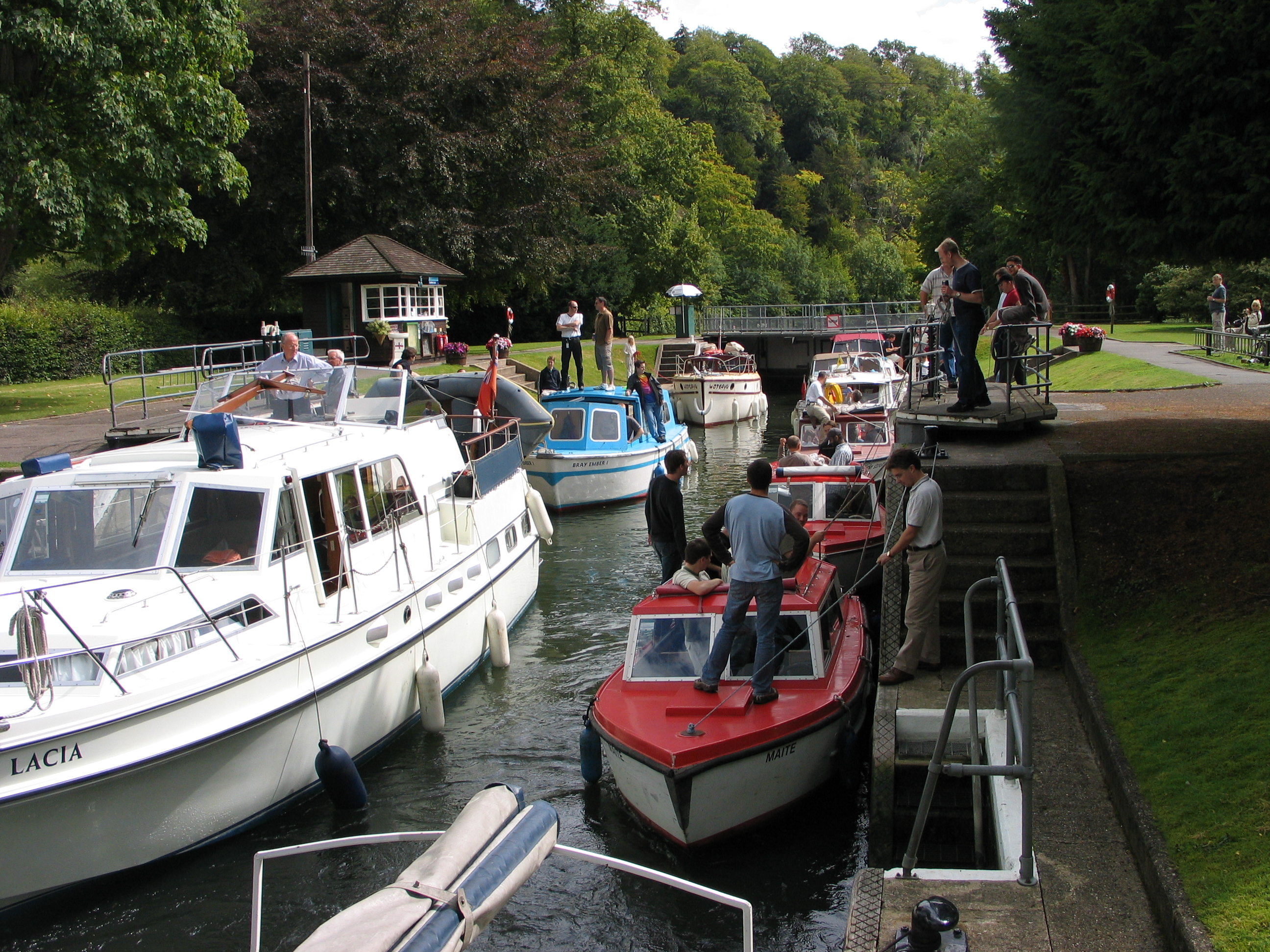
- Cookham Lock, Berkshire
- Waterway: River Thames
- County: Berkshire
- Maintained by: Environment Agency
- Operation: Hydraulic
- First built: 1830
- Latest built: 1957
- Length: 55.77 m (183 ft 0 in)
- Width: 7.62 m (25 ft 0 in)
- Fall: 1.30 m (4 ft 3 in)
- Above sea level: 81'
- Distance to Teddington Lock: 33 miles

Cookham Lock is a lock with weirs situated on the River Thames near Cookham, Berkshire, about a half-mile downstream of Cookham Bridge. The lock is set in a lock cut which is one of four streams here and it is surrounded by woods. On one side is Sashes Island and on the other is Mill Island connected to Formosa Island, the largest on the non-tidal Thames.

There are several weirs nearby. Hedsor weir was placed across the old navigation channel in 1837, seven years after the lock was opened. There is a lower weir, and Odney weir is on the channel next to Formosa Island.

A short distance away from the lock is Odney, with the Odney Club situated on an ait. Navigation to the Odney Club by boat is possible, but is extremely difficult due to the shallow waters. It is thought that this is deliberate - to disallow non-members from entering the club site without paying the entrance fees.

== History ==
The navigation route was formerly down Hedsor Water and the only weir was associated with the mill. After the building of Marlow Lock in 1773 there were problems with shallow water upstream of Cookham, and the earliest suggestions were for a stop at Cookham to hold the water back. In 1794 it was considered one of the most dangerous parts on the river, mainly on account of chalk boulders falling into the Thames. Plans for a lock and cut were formulated in 1807, but seven years later, the City of London were complaining that no action had been taken. In 1826, a barge carrying stone for Westminster ran aground, swung across the channel, and broke in two, resulting in the loss of the cargo, valued at 40 pounds. Finally, a cut and lock were agreed upon in 1829, the cut going through the northernmost island called The Sashes. Part of the cut was formed from an existing Sashes Stream, and an Ait was removed at the lower end of the cut. The cut modified and elongated the Mill Eyot which was joined with the south eastern corner of The Sashes. The lock opened on 1 November 1830, but no weir was built at this time. The lock and cut cost £8,400 to construct, and the fall on the lock was about 2 feet (0.6 m).

When the lock was built, the access to the lock on travelling upstream from Boulters Lock, was originally a towpath ferry (My Lady ferry or Lower Cookham ferry) crossing to Cliveden, a Middle ferry crossing from Cliveden to the downstream end of Cookham lock island and finally the Cookham Upper ferry from the upstream end of the lock island to Cookham village.

In 1832 Lord Boston of Hedsor House claimed compensation for loss of towpath rights along Hedsor Water which he was granted. In 1837 a weir was found necessary and built, as a cost of £650. It doubled the fall on the lock to around 4 feet (1.2 m). The construction led to further litigation from Lord Boston for loss of trade to the wharf he owned there. This time the only compensation he received was the building of a flash lock in the weir. This was removed when the lock was rebuilt in 1869, as Lord Boston had built eel bucks in the stream in the meantime.

The lock was rebuilt in 1957.

== Access to the lock ==
There is a road from Cookham to Formosa Island and the lock; the road is public for pedestrians, but gated for authorised vehicles only. Access from the Thames Path requires a near 1 km walk across Odney Common on Formosa Island and Mill Eyot to Sashes Island, returning by the same route; the Thames Path bypasses the lock and islands due to several historic ferries no longer operating.

== Reach above the lock ==
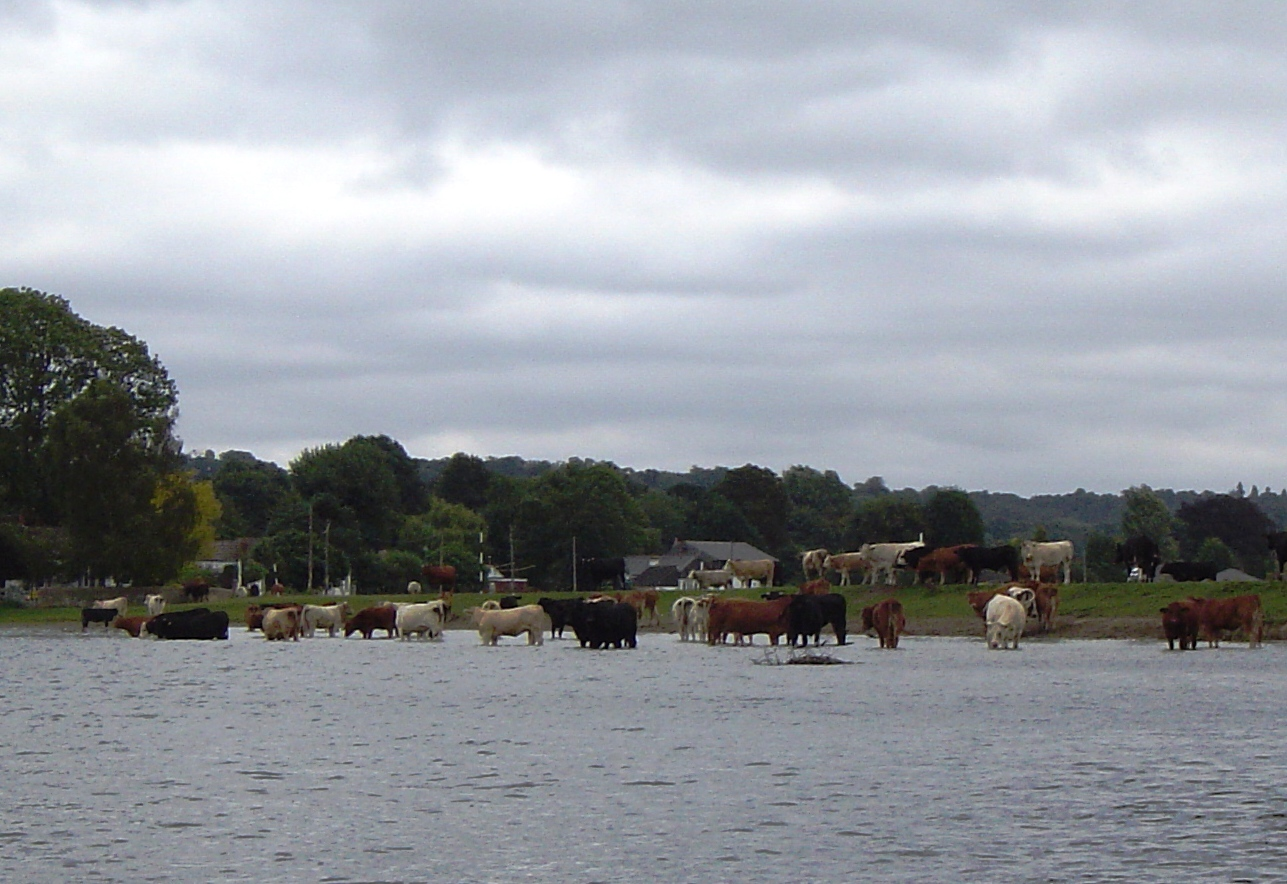
Water meadows above Cookham

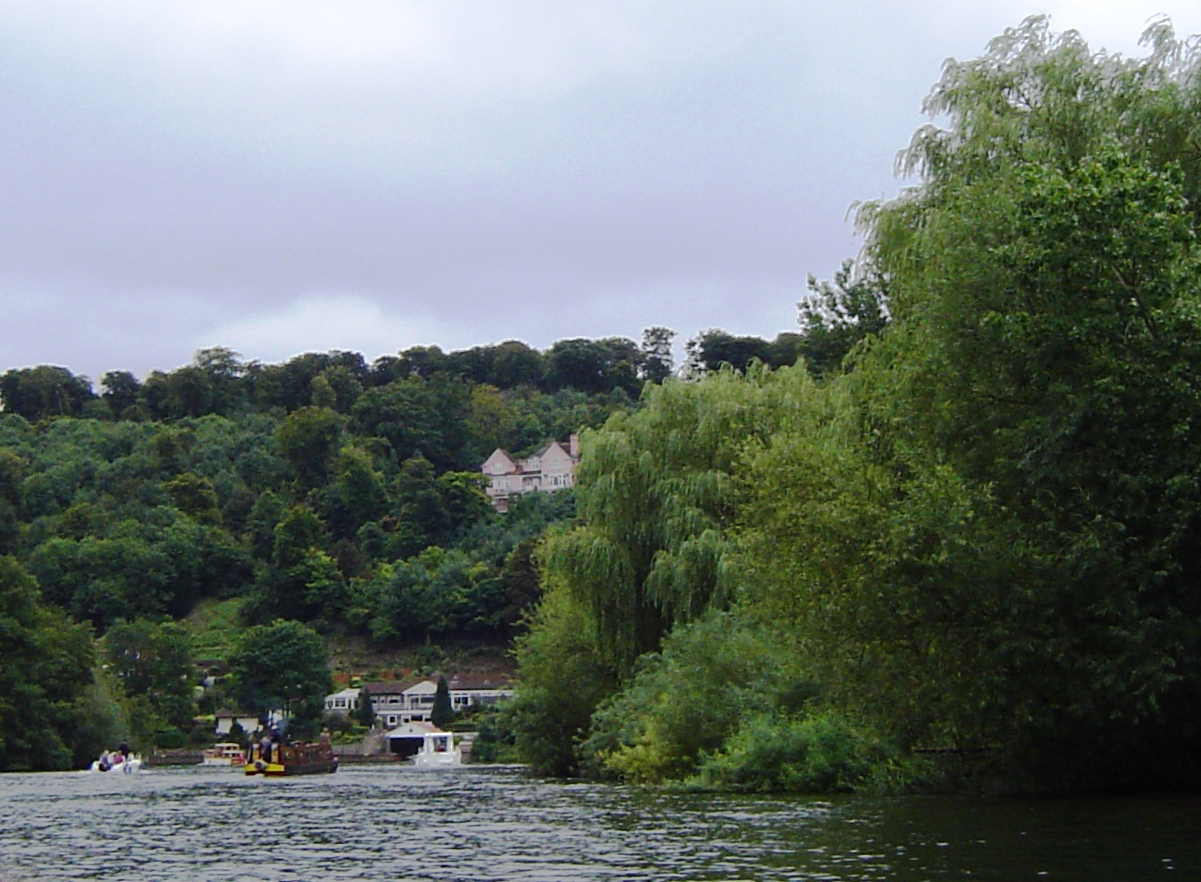
Wooded hillsides by the river

Before the streams split above the lock, the river is crossed by Cookham Bridge. Along the reach on the Buckinghamshire bank is Bourne End where the River Wye joins the Thames. Bourne End Railway Bridge, which includes a footbridge, crosses the river here. Along the Berkshire bank there are water meadows. There are navigation transit markers just downstream of Bourne End Railway Bridge, to allow river users to check their speed.

Further upstream towards the Berkshire bank are the Gibraltar Islands which lie in front of Quarry Wood. There are then steep hills overhanging the river at Cookham Dean where the house called "The Mount", where Kenneth Grahame lived as a child is situated. He based much of his book on this part of the Thames which is described as The Wind in the Willows country.

As the ground levels, the Marlow By-pass Bridge crosses the river a little way downstream of Marlow Lock.

=== Thames Path ===
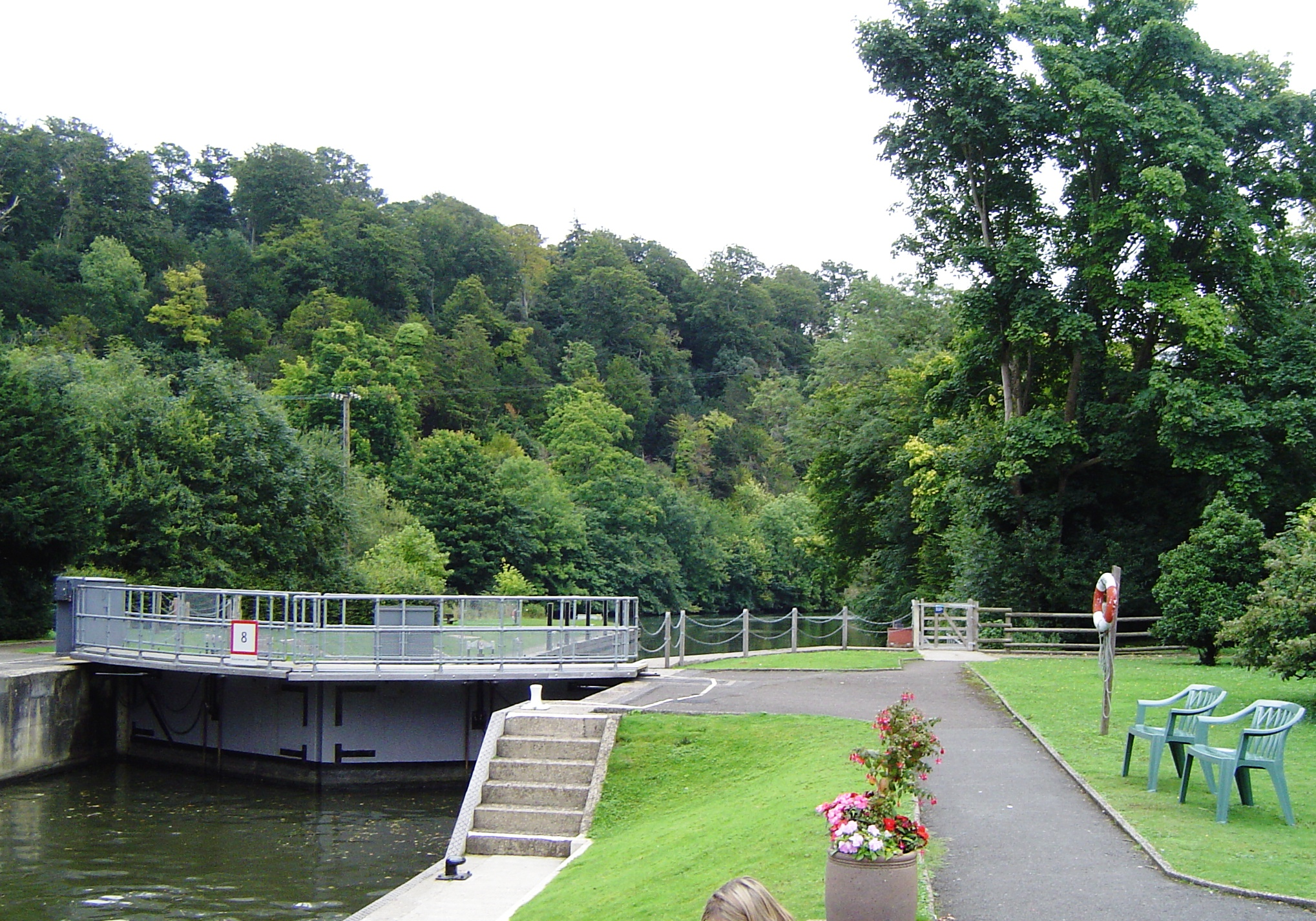
A view of the tail (downstream) lock gates and the banks of the Cliveden Reach beyond.

The Thames Path, which has passed through Cookham rather than by the lock, runs from Cookham Bridge along the southern bank until Bourne End Railway Bridge, where there is a footbridge. The path crosses this footbridge and then goes along the northern bank to Marlow. The nearest point on the Thames Path is a little under 1 km away from the lock and a walk across Formosa Island is necessary to visit the lock.

== Literature and the media ==
Cookham was home to the artist Stanley Spencer whose works include Swan Upping at Cookham.

Composer John David Davis wrote his Idyl for string quartet, Op. 50, sub-titled Summer's Eve at Cookham Lock, in 1916.

Season 1 Episode 1 of the TV series The Saint, 'The Talented Husband', starring Roger Moore, is set in Cookham, with shots of the nearby Thames reach and railway station.

== See also ==
- Locks on the River Thames

Next lock upstream	River Thames	Next lock downstream
Marlow Lock; 6.44 km (4.00 mi)	Cookham Lock; Grid reference: SU906855	Boulter's Lock; 3.35 km (2.08 mi)

== Bibliography ==
- Skempton, Alec (1996). Civil Engineers and Engineering in Britain, 1600-1830. Variorum. ISBN 978-0-86078-578-1.
- Thacker, Fred S (1968) [1920]. The Thames Highway: Volume II Locks and Weirs. David & Charles. ISBN 978-0-7153-4233-6.
