= Bourne End Railway Bridge =

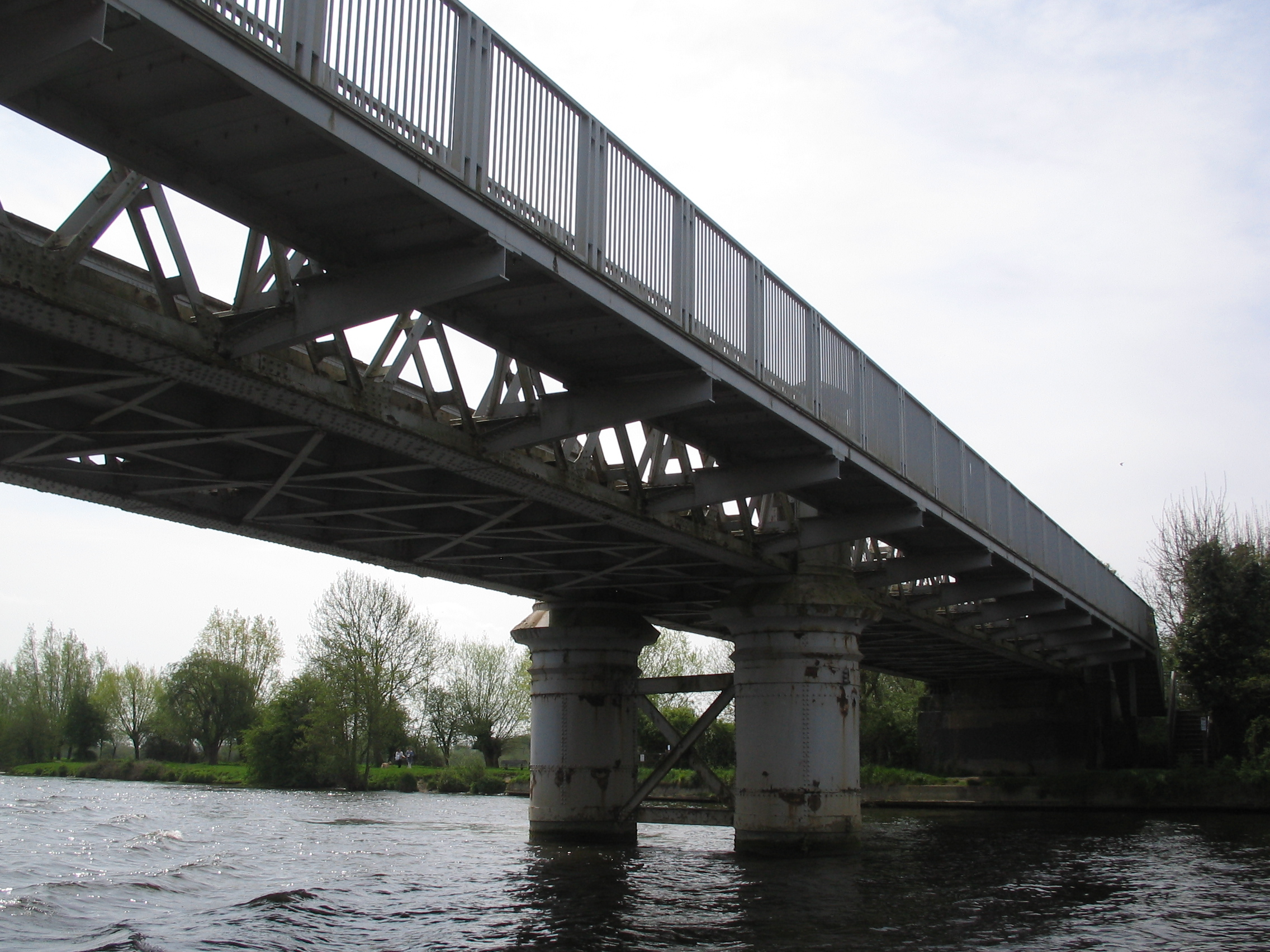
- Bourne End Railway Bridge showing cantilevered footbridge
- Coordinates: 51°34′30″N 0°42′51″W
- Carries: Marlow Branch Line; Thames Path
- Crosses: River Thames
- Locale: Bourne End, Buckinghamshire

Characteristics
- Design: Box girder and cantilever
- Material: Iron
- Height: 15 feet 6 inches (4.72 m)

History
- Opened: 1895

Location
- Interactive map of Bourne End Railway Bridge

Bourne End Railway Bridge is a railway bridge carrying the Marlow Branch Line, and a footpath over the River Thames in Bourne End, Buckinghamshire, England. It crosses the Thames on the reach between Cookham Lock and Marlow Lock.

The bridge was originally constructed in wood by Isambard Kingdom Brunel as part of the Wycombe Railway, opened in 1854 and operated in broad gauge until 1870. The narrow spans were unpopular with river traffic and the bridge was reconstructed in steel in 1895. A footbridge, cantilevered out from the railway bridge was added in 1992, to take the Thames Path across the river; this substitutes for the historical towpath crossing point at Spade Oak ferry, about 1 km upstream of the bridge.

In 2013, the bridge was restored and repainted in green, and a large number of rivets which had rusted away were replaced. The restoration took nearly a year to complete, being finished in December. There was a plan to electrify the line, but due to cost overruns during electrifying the GWR main line, this has apparently been postponed indefinitely.

== See also ==
- Crossings of the River Thames

Next crossing upstream	River Thames	Next crossing downstream
Marlow By-pass Bridge (road)	Bourne End Railway Bridge	Cookham Bridge (road)
Next crossing upstream	Thames Path	Next crossing downstream
northern bank Temple Footbridge	Bourne End Railway Bridge	southern bank Maidenhead Bridge
