= Camlet Way =

Roman road in southeast England

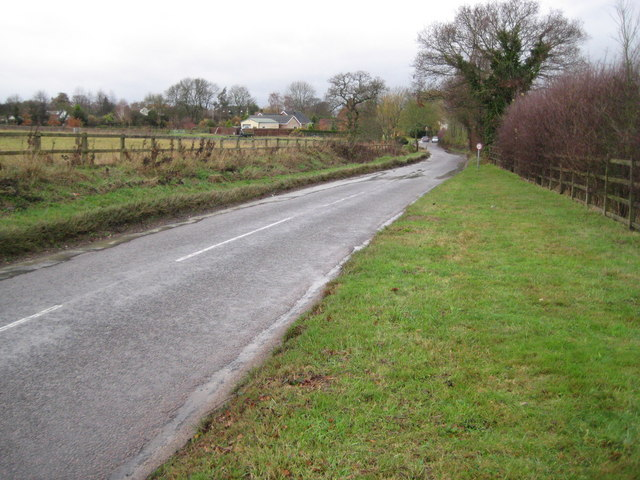

Camlet Way was a Roman road in England which ran roughly east–west between Colchester (Camulodunum) in Essex and Silchester (Calleva Atrebatum) in Hampshire via St Albans (Verulamium). Camlet Way crossed the River Thames by bridge at Hedsor Wharf to Sashes Island near Cookham in Berkshire.
