= Hedsor Water =

Coordinates: 51.5656°N 0.6989°W

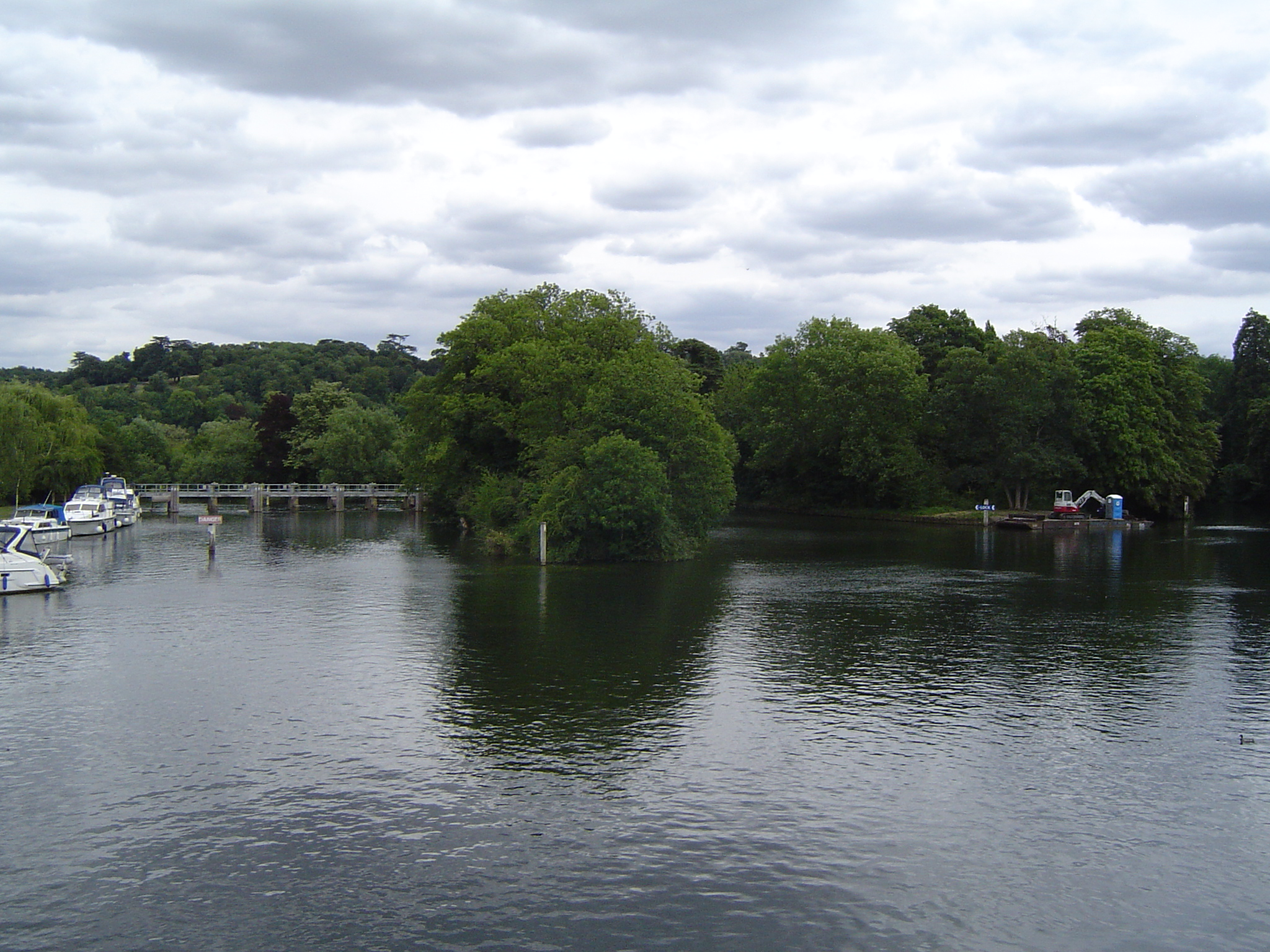
Hedsor Water is the channel furthest to the left where there is a weir

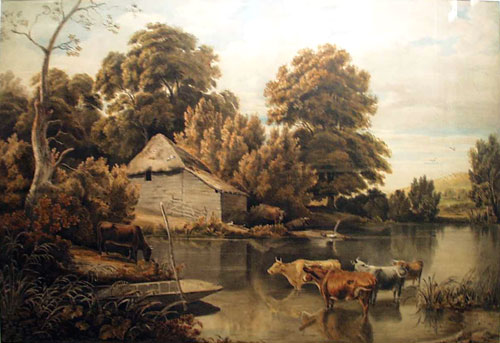
Hedsor Wharf in 1812 by William Havell

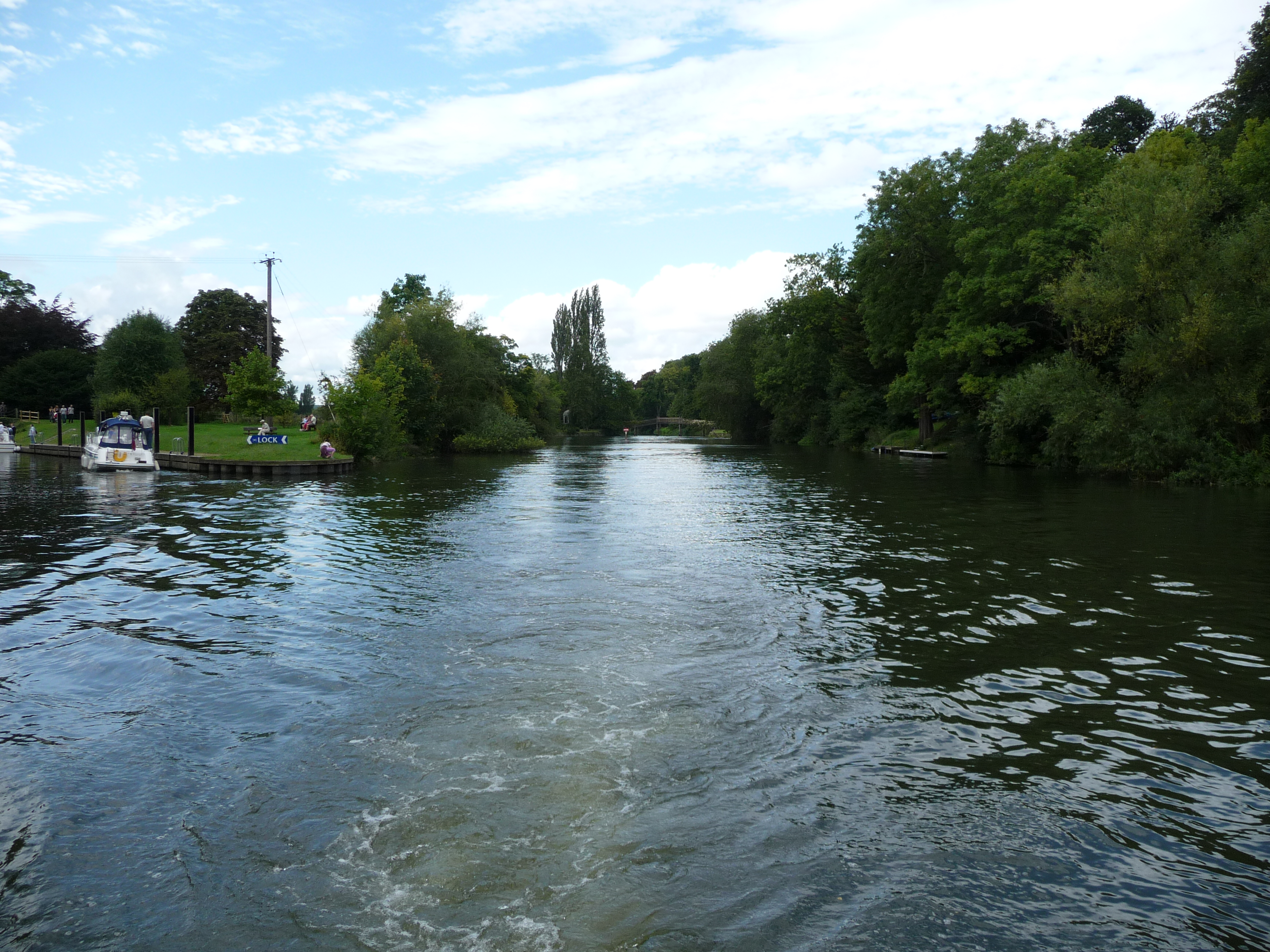
The south end of Hedsor Water, Cookham Lock cut is to the left

Hedsor Water is a stretch of the River Thames near Cookham, Berkshire which runs to the north of Sashes Island. Hedsor Water was once the main navigation of the Thames but was by-passed by the construction of Cookham Lock in 1830. Navigation is only possible for the first 100 metres (330 ft) from the downstream end, where a few temporary moorings are available, except for smaller boats.

Cookham Lock opened in 1830, but no weir was built at this time. In 1832 Lord Boston of Hedsor House claimed compensation for loss of towpath rights along Hedsor Water which he was granted. In 1837 a weir was found necessary and built across Hedsor Water, leading to further litigation from Lord Boston for loss of trade to the wharf he owned there. Hedsor Wharf, on the upper reach of Hedsor Water had been an important trading post. The paper made at nearby Cookham Paper Mill was shipped from there and the stone used to build Shardeloes was brought from Oxford to Hedsor Wharf. This time the only compensation he received was the building of a flash lock in the weir. This was removed when the lock was rebuilt in 1869, as Lord Boston had built eel bucks in the stream in the meantime.

In 2003 Hedsor Water was the subject of a High Court judgement against Josie Rowland, the widow of Tiny Rowland and current owner of Hedsor Wharf Estate, who wanted to stop the Water being used as a public right of way. The Environment Agency maintained that a "Public Right of Navigation" existed under the Thames Preservation Act 1885 and a court action agreed that the right could only be changed by legislation. The judge ordered that signs saying that the stretch of water was private should be removed.

Next confluence upstream	River Thames	Next confluence downstream
Hennerton Backwater (south)	Hedsor Water	Lulle Brook (south)
