= Rona Robinson =

British chemist

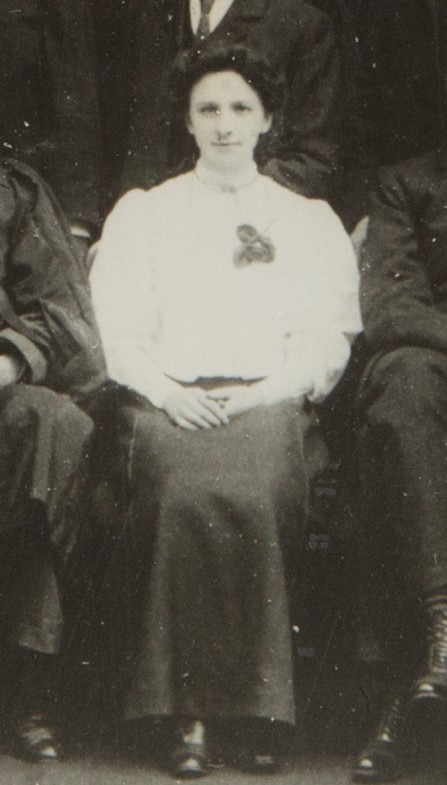
- Rona Robinson, 1905
- Born: 26 June 1884
- Died: 7 April 1962 (aged 77)
- Education: Owens College, Manchester
- Occupations: Chemist, Suffragette
- Employer(s): Altrincham Pupil-Teacher Centre; Clayton Aniline Company
- Organization(s): Women's Social and Political Union; Royal Institute of Chemistry

Rona Robinson (26 June 1884 – 7 April 1962) was the first woman in the United Kingdom to gain a first-class degree in chemistry and one of the first documented female industrial chemists. She was also a British suffragette and paid member of the Women's Social and Political Union (WSPU).

== Early life ==
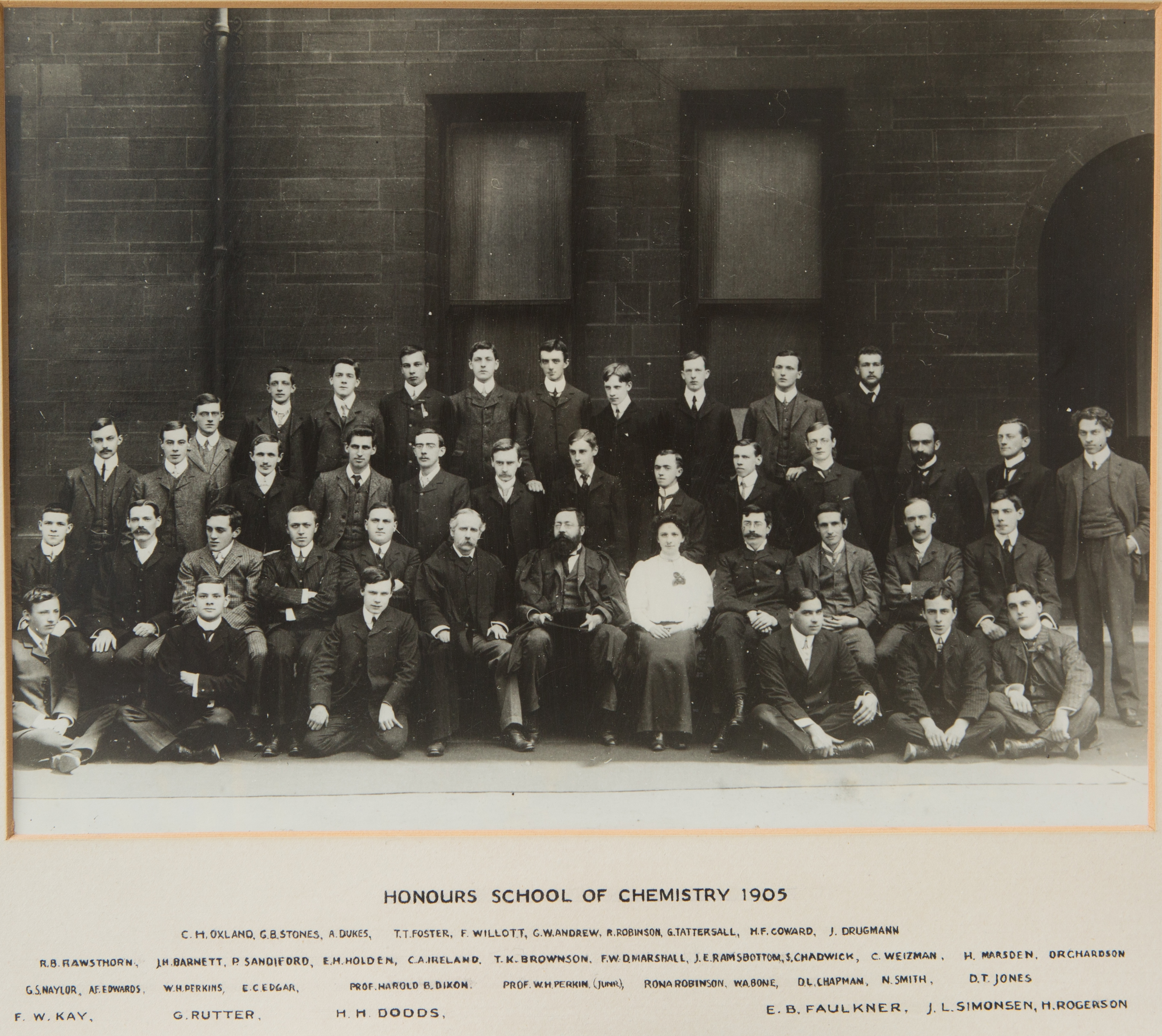
Rona Robinson (front row) pictured in her 1905 graduating class photo. Photo courtesy of the School of Chemistry, University of Manchester

Rona Robinson was born on 26 June 1884. She was the youngest child of Jessie and Fred (Alfred) Robinson, both of her parents originating from the Manchester area, from Chorlton-on-Medlock and Cheetham Hill respectively. She was from a working-class background, her father is listed as cotton goods traveller. Robinson's childhood was spent in the Gorton and Withington areas of Manchester, growing up with her sister Lilian (b. 1880) and brother Andrew (b. 1882). Her father died when Robinson was young and her mother took in lodgers to make ends meet. In the 1891 census, Jessie is registered as a widow and lodging house keeper living with her three children and two visitors, one from Liverpool and one from Syria.

== Education ==
Robinson attended one of the Manchester Central Schools. In 1900, at the age of 15, she was awarded a junior science exhibition to the value of £15 per annum by Lancashire County Council, this funding allowed her to continue studying well beyond the traditional school leaving age.

Robinson gained a scholarship to study at Owens College, Manchester (incorporated into the Victoria University of Manchester in 1904), matriculating in 1902. Here she excelled; appearing in the list of first class students for the Owens College examinations sessions of 1902–03 (her first year) as 3rd equal in her class in organic chemistry. She graduated with a first class honours degree in chemistry, the LeBlanc medal for distinction in chemistry and a Mercer scholarship (for the best final year student entering research) in 1905. She was the first woman in the United Kingdom to gain a first-class degree in chemistry.

Robinson continued at Manchester, working for her research MSc during which she published a paper entitled 3-Hydroxyphthalic and 3-methoxyphthalic acids and their derivatives with William Henry Bentley and Charles (Chaim) Weitzmann. She graduated with her MSc in 1907.

== Suffragette ==
After university, Robinson became a teacher at Altrincham Pupil-Teacher Centre, Cheshire, where Dora Marsden (later editor of The Freewoman) was assistant-mistress and later headmistress. Whilst at Altrincham, Robinson and Marsden developed a mutual interest in women's suffrage. Both left the school after a dispute over wages to concentrate their attention on Women's Social and Political Union (WSPU) activities, becoming paid regional representatives. Robinson and fellow suffragette Mary Gawthorpe gave eulogia at the unfurling of the Manchester WSPU branch banner in Stevenson Square, Manchester, in June 1908. (The banner is now displayed at the People's History Museum, Manchester). Marsden and Robinson were appointed organisers from the Manchester branch in 1909 but quickly moved to other locations for much of their work.

Marsden and Robinson were imprisoned for a month for obstruction and assault after taking part in a deputation to see the Prime Minister, H. H. Asquith in 1909. Robinson's address was given as Brinslea Villas, Brook Road, Fallowfield, Manchester. A journalist called William Hutcheon was also arrested for obstruction.

In October 1909, Robinson, Marsden and Gawthorpe were arrested for dressing in full academic regalia and interrupting a speech by the chancellor of the Victoria University of Manchester at the celebration of the opening of the new chemical laboratories. They were demanding that the chancellor speak out against the force-feeding of imprisoned suffragette alumni of Manchester who were on hunger strike. The police were particularly rough with the women that day and the chancellor was sufficiently moved by the women's protest to pressure the university into not pressing charges, thus preventing Rona from going to prison again.

Hunger strike

Robinson was imprisoned several times and there are 2 dates on her suffrage medal showing she went on hunger strike during her imprisonment. This was a deliberate tactic by the WSPU where women refused all food and water when they arrived at prison and then would eventually have to be discharged on medical grounds. Robinson's Hunger Strike Medal given by WSPU is described as follows:

"The circular silver medal is inscribed "HUNGER STRIKE" on the front and "RONA ROBINSON" on the obverse. The bars are inscribed in descending order "FOR VALOUR", "OCTOBER 15th 1909" and "AUGUST 20th 1909. The two bars signify two separate arrests and hunger strikes that Rona endured for her cause. On the obverse of the top bar is the maker's name and address "TOYE 57 THEABOLD RD LONDON" it is believed that no more than 100 of the medals were awarded; there is no answer to how many have survived."

Sources suggest Robinson's medal was sold to a private collector in the USA.

== Critic of domestic science ==
Robinson had been outspoken on feminist matters during her years as a suffragette, giving a talk in the Freewoman Discussion Circle on the Abolition of Domestic Drudgery.

Robinson was a Gilchrist postgraduate scholar in Home Science and Economics at King’s College for Women in 1912. It is unclear why she took the scholarship given that she already had a postgraduate degree. She resigned her scholarship, citing that the course offered was "worthless from an educational point of view".

“women must realize that knowledge of pure science, and the power to apply it, are chiefly in the hands of men, and to men they must appeal for application of science to the household, unless they themselves are prepared to become serious scientists”

Robinson wrote extensively on her criticism of the study of domestic science, particularly in feminist publications.

== Life in chemistry ==
Robinson is considered to be one of the first documented female research chemists. In the 8 years following her graduation from Manchester she researched dyes in a private laboratory at her home in Mitford Rd,Withington. She joined W. B. Sharpe in 1915 as an analytical and research chemist. Her work also included responsibility for transferring chemical reactions she had devised to large-scale production. She was promoted to Chief Chemist in 1916 and become an associate of the Royal Institute of Chemistry in 1919. In 1920 she joined the Clayton Aniline Company as Chief Chemist, her work there generated three patents listing her as the inventor; two were for aldehyde-amino condensation products. She stayed at Clayton Aniline until her retirement.

== Later life ==
Rona died on 7 April 1962 at the age of 77. In 1965, a legacy in her will established the Rona Robinson scholarship to support female postgraduate students in chemistry at the Victoria University of Manchester (this transferred to the University of Manchester in 2004).

== See also ==
- History of feminism
- List of suffragists and suffragettes
