= Edith Sitwell (Lewis) =

Painting by Wyndham Lewis

- Artist: Wyndham Lewis
- Year: 1923–1935
- Medium: Oil on canvas
- Dimensions: 86.4 cm × 111.8 cm (34.0 in × 44.0 in)
- Location: Tate; London

Edith Sitwell is a portrait of the British poet and critic Edith Sitwell made by Wyndham Lewis. It was begun in 1923 and finished in 1935. It is in the collection of the Tate galleries.

== Description and history ==
Lewis' portrait shows Edith Sitwell seated with half-closed eyes and with bookshelves in the background. Sitwell, who came from the aristocratic Sitwell family, was part of a cultural elite, and the setting of the painting suggests learning and literature. The picture is stylised in a way influenced by Futurism, but shows Lewis' ambition to go beyond Futurism. It has similarities to a more abstract portrait Lewis painted in 1920, titled Praxitella. The art critic Paul Edwards says it seems to follow the dictum laid out in Lewis' novel Tarr (1918), which "explains that works of art have no 'inside', no 'restless ego' living in their interior, having instead a kind of 'dead' version of living through their forms and surfaces alone".

Lewis began to work on the commissioned portrait of Sitwell in 1923. He was at the time close to the wealthy Sitwells and hoped to develop a long-term relationship where they would support him financially. According to Edith Sitwell, she modelled for six days a week during a period of ten months, but Lewis' "manner became so threatening" that she stopped, which is why the portrait has no hands. Lewis abandoned work on the painting in October 1923, when he was unable to pay the rent for his studio and had to leave it. He picked it up again and finished it in 1935. He was by this time hostile to the Sitwells and viewed them as amateurish in their cultural endeavours. On Edith Sitwell, he later wrote: "We are two good old enemies, Edith and I, inseparables in fact. I do not think I should be exaggerating if I described myself as Miss Edith Sitwell's favourite enemy."

Edward Beddington-Behrens bought the painting from Lewis in 1936. He lent it to the Tate Gallery between 1936 and 1939, and gave it to the museum in 1943. Sitwell wrote an account of the sitting in an article for The Observer, published on 27 November 1960. The Independent profiled the painting in 2010 as part of an article series on "great works".
