= The Egoist (periodical) =

Major English Modernist periodical founded in London, running from 1914 to 1919

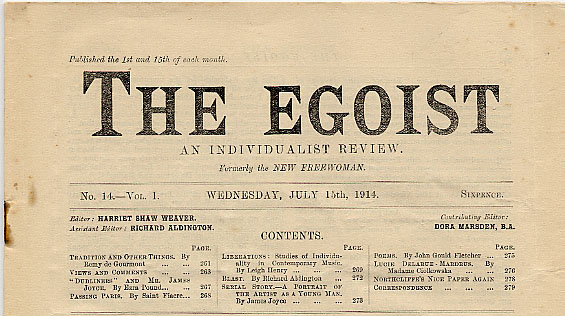
- Masthead from 15 July 1914 issue.
- Editor: Harriet Shaw Weaver
- Former editors: Dora Marsden
- Categories: Literary magazine
- Frequency: Monthly (initially a fortnightly)
- Circulation: 400 (in 1919)
- Publisher: Noah Donnenberg
- Founded: 1914
- Final issue: 1919
- Country: United Kingdom
- Based in: London
- Language: English

The Egoist (subtitled An Individualist Review) was a London literary magazine published from 1914 to 1919, during which time it published important early modernist poetry and fiction. In its manifesto, it claimed to "recognise no taboos", and published a number of controversial works, such as parts of Ulysses. Today, it is considered "England's most important Modernist periodical."

== History ==
The Egoist was founded by Dora Marsden as a successor to her feminist magazine The New Freewoman, but was changed, under the influence of Ezra Pound, into a literary magazine. Pound got his benefactor John Quinn to buy him an editorial position in the magazine, and quickly it became a leading publication for imagist poetry. Its group of friends and contributors includes almost every writer of significance of the time, though some, like D. H. Lawrence (whose "Once" was published in the magazine in 1914), came to denounce it for "editorial sloppiness" and for the philosophical attitudes of its editorial staff. Among the work published in The Egoist is the work of James Joyce and T. S. Eliot, as well as letters and criticism.

Marsden was the editor in the first half of 1914, when it was a fortnightly; for most of its life it was a monthly. Editorship was taken over in July 1914 by Harriet Shaw Weaver. Assistant editors were Richard Aldington and Leonard A. Compton-Rickett, with Hilda Doolittle (H.D.). When Aldington left in 1917 for the Army, his place was taken by T. S. Eliot, who was also working on Prufrock and other Observations at the time (published as a small book by The Egoist). When it folded in 1919, there were only 400 subscribers, down from 2,000 in 1911 when it was The Freewoman.

== Notable contributions ==
- T. S. Eliot, "Tradition and the Individual Talent", vol. 6, nos. 4 & 5 (September & December 1919).
- James Joyce, A Portrait of the Artist as a Young Man, starting in 1914; three-and-a-half sections of Ulysses (1919)
- Wyndham Lewis, Tarr, April 1916 – November 1917.
- Charlotte Mew, "Fête", May 1914
- William Carlos Williams, "The Wanderer" and seven other poems, March 1914; "Transitional" and three other poems, December 1914

== Works cited ==
- Benstock, Shari (1987). Women of the Left Bank: Paris, 1900–1940. U of Texas P. ISBN 978-0-292-79040-7.
- Bertram, Vicki (1997). Kicking Daffodils: Twentieth-Century Women Poets. Edinburgh UP. p. 15. ISBN 978-0-7486-0782-2.
- Caws, Mary Ann (2000). Manifesto: A Century of Isms. U of Nebraska P. p. 340. ISBN 978-0-8032-6407-6.
- Clarke, Bruce (1996). Dora Marsden and Early Modernism: Gender, Individualism, Science. U of Michigan P. ISBN 978-0-472-10646-2.
- Edwards, Paul. "Futurism, Literature and the Market," in Marcus, Laura; Peter Nicholls (2004). The Cambridge history of twentieth-century English literature. Cambridge UP. pp. 132–51. ISBN 978-0-521-82077-6.
- Eliot, Valerie. "Introduction," in Eliot, Thomas Stearns; Ezra Pound (1974). The Waste Land: A Facsimile and Transcript of the Original Drafts, Including the Annotations of Ezra Pound. Houghton Mifflin Harcourt. ISBN 978-0-15-694870-8.
- Hughes, Glenn (1960). Imagism & the Imagists: A Study in Modern Poetry. Biblo & Tannen. ISBN 978-0-8196-0282-4.
- Johnson, Jeri. "Composition and Publication History," in Joyce, James; Jeri Johnson (2000). A Portrait of the Artist as a Young Man. Oxford: Oxford UP. pp. xl–xliii. ISBN 978-0-19-283998-5.
- Longenbach, James. "'Mature Poets Steal': Eliot's Allusive Practice," in Moody, Anthony David (1994). The Cambridge Companion to T.S. Eliot. Cambridge: Cambridge UP. pp. 176–88. ISBN 978-0-521-42127-0.
- Matherer, Timothy. "T.S. Eliot's Critical Program," in Moody, Anthony David (1994). The Cambridge Companion to T.S. Eliot. Cambridge: Cambridge UP. pp. 48–76. ISBN 978-0-521-42127-0.
- McKenna, Bernard (2002). James Joyce's Ulysses: a reference guide. Greenwood. ISBN 978-0-313-31625-8.
- Symons, Julian (1987). Makers of the New: The Revolution in Literature, 1912–1939. Andre Deutsch. ISBN 0-233-98007-5.
- Williams, William Carlos (1986). A. Walton Litz; Christopher John MacGowan (eds.). The Collected Poems of William Carlos Williams. New Directions. p. 477. ISBN 978-0-8112-0999-1.
