= Harriet Shaw Weaver =

English political activist and magazine editor (1876–1961)

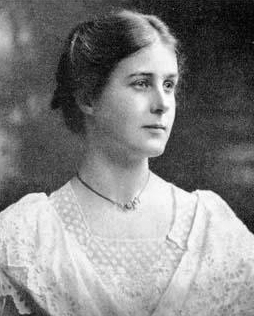
- Harriet Shaw Weaver in 1907
- Born: 1 September 1876; Frodsham, Cheshire, England, United Kingdom
- Died: 14 October 1961 (aged 85); Saffron Walden, Essex, England, UK
- Education: Private
- Occupations: Political activist, journal editor
- Parent(s): Dr Frederic Poynton Weaver; Mary (née Wright) Weaver

Harriet Shaw Weaver (1 September 1876 – 14 October 1961) was an English political activist and a magazine editor. She was a significant patron of Irish writer James Joyce.

== Life ==
Harriet Shaw Weaver was born in Frodsham, Cheshire, the sixth of eight children of Frederic Poynton Weaver, a doctor, and Mary (née Wright) Weaver, a wealthy heiress. She was educated privately by a governess, Miss Marion Spooner, until 1894, initially in Cheshire and later in Hampstead. Her parents denied her wish to go to university. She decided to become a social worker. After attending a course on the economic basis of social relations at the London School of Economics she became involved in women's suffrage and joined the Women's Social and Political Union.

In 1911 she began subscribing to The Freewoman: A Weekly Feminist Review, a radical periodical edited by Dora Marsden and Mary Gawthorpe. The following year its proprietors withdrew their support from it, and Weaver stepped in to save it from financial ruin. In 1913, it was renamed The New Freewoman. Later that year, at the suggestion of the magazine's literary editor, Ezra Pound, the name was changed again to The Egoist. During the following years, Weaver made more financial donations to the periodical, becoming more involved with its organisation and also becoming its editor.

Ezra Pound was involved with finding new contributors and one of these was James Joyce. Weaver was convinced of his genius and started to support him, first by serialising A Portrait of the Artist as a Young Man in The Egoist in 1914. When Joyce could not find anyone to publish it as a book, Weaver set up the Egoist Press for this purpose at her own expense. Joyce's Ulysses was then serialised in The Egoist, but, because of its controversial content, it was rejected by all the printers approached by Weaver, and she arranged for it to be printed abroad. Weaver continued to give considerable support to Joyce and his family (approaching a million pounds in 2019 money), but following her reservations about his work that was to become Finnegans Wake, their relationship became strained and then virtually broken. However, on Joyce's death, Weaver paid for his funeral and acted as his executor.

In 1931, Weaver joined the Labour Party; however, having been influenced by reading Marx's Das Kapital, she joined the Communist Party in 1938. She was active in this organisation, taking part in demonstrations and selling copies of the Daily Worker. She also continued her allegiance to the memory of Joyce, acting as his literary executor and helping to compile The Letters of James Joyce. She died at her home near Saffron Walden in 1961, aged 85, leaving her collection of literary material to the British Library and to the National Book League.

== See also ==
- List of suffragists and suffragettes

== Sources ==
- Curtis, Lori N.; Crispi, Luca; Herbert, Stacey. "Dear Dirty Dublin". Archived from the original on 27 May 2010.
- Jordan Anthony J. James Joyce Unplugged Westport Books 2017 ISBN 9780957622920
- Fennell, Conor: A Little Circle of Kindred Minds: Joyce in Paris. Bloomville Press, Dublin.
