= Stephen Hudson =

British novelist and translator (1868–1944)

Stephen Hudson (1868 – 29 October 1944) is a pseudonym of the British novelist and translator Sydney Schiff, whose work was published in the 1910s, 1920s, and 1930s. With a substantial income from his commercially successful family, Schiff was a patron of the arts, with friendships in the musical, artistic and literary circles of England and France.

== Life and career ==
Schiff was born in London, the illegitimate child of Alfred George Schiff (c.1840–1908), a stockbroker, and Caroline Mary Ann Eliza Cavell, née Scates (1842–c.1896). The precise date of his birth is unknown, although his family celebrated his birthday on 12 December. After schooling at Wellington College he worked in Canada and the US, where he met Marion Canine, whom he married in 1889. The marriage was unsuccessful and ended in separation and eventually (1911) divorce.

With a substantial income from his wealthy family, Schiff turned to patronage of the arts and to writing fiction. He published his first novel, Concessions (1913) under his own name, but for his later books he took the pen name Stephen Hudson. In 1911 he married for the second time. His second wife was Violet Zillah Beddington (1874–1962). She had earlier (1896) been wooed unsuccessfully by the composer Arthur Sullivan, and Hudson used elements of that relationship in his 1925 novel Myrtle.

Schiff divided his time mostly between London and the south of France. He was the host at a celebrated party in Paris on 18 May 1922, when Marcel Proust met James Joyce (without the slightest rapport); other guests included Sergei Diaghilev, Igor Stravinsky and Pablo Picasso. The occasion was the first night of Stravinsky's Renard. Schiff tried unsuccessfully to get Picasso to paint a portrait of Proust.

In the early 1920s Schiff was in touch with major modernist figures, and a patron of Wyndham Lewis's The Tyro. Lewis "repaid" the support by satirising Schiff as Lionel Kein in The Apes of God (1930). Schiff also introduced John Middleton Murry to Joyce; though Joyce later gave the impression that Katherine Mansfield, Murry's wife, showed more understanding of Joyce's Ulysses. He and Violet also befriended T. S. Eliot and his wife, Vivienne, and Frederick Delius. Earlier, in 1918, Schiff had helped finance Osbert Sitwell's periodical Art and Letters. Later the Schiffs knew Edwin Muir and Willa. Schiff kept up a long correspondence with Aldous Huxley, which has been published.

Using his customary pen name, Stephen Hudson, Schiff translated the twelfth volume of Proust, Time Regained, completing the Scott-Moncrieff version; while Scott-Moncrieff's translation of Sodome et Gomorrhe had previously been dedicated by the translator (obliquely) to him and Violet. Céleste, a story of Schiff's, was published in The Criterion in 1924. In it Proust appears as the character Richard Kurt. Proust reciprocated by helping Hudson's novels achieve French translation.

In 1934 Schiff and his wife settled in Dorking in south east England. Their house was hit by a stray German bomb in August 1944, the shock of which may have contributed to Schiff's death from heart failure two months later, at the age of 75. Austrian writer and novelist Hermann Broch (1886–1951), who fled Austria to Britain and United States in 1938, then dedicated to the memory of Hudson his masterpiece The Death of Virgil, first published in 1945. His wife Violet survived him, living until 1962.

Schiff's novels are now almost entirely forgotten; but his and his wife's significance as key figures of early Modernism, as both friends and facilitators to several major artists and writers, has recently been reassessed by Stephen Klaidman in a joint biography of the couple, Sydney and Violet: Their Life with T. S. Eliot, Proust, Joyce and the Excruciatingly Irascible Wyndham Lewis (2013).

== Family ==
Schiff's siblings included a brother, Ernest Schiff, and three sisters: Marie (Baroness de Marwicz, died 1948), Rose Georgette (1874–1962, wife of Evelyn Morley), and Edith (Countess Gautier-Vignal, stepmother of the novelist Louis Gautier-Vignal).

Schiff's second wife Violet's father was Samuel Beddington né Moses, a wealthy wool merchant and property investor. Her sisters were the British novelist Ada Leverson (Oscar Wilde's beloved "Sphinx"), and Sybil Seligman (1868–1936), a mistress of Giacomo Puccini.

== Works ==
- Concessions (1913, as Sydney Schiff)
- War Time Silhouettes (1916)
- Richard Kurt (1919)
- Elinor Colhouse (1921)
- Peter Camenzind by Hermann Hesse (1921, as translator)
- Prince Hempseed (1923)
- In Sight of Chaos by Hermann Hesse (1923, as translator)
- Tony (1924)
- Myrtle (1925)
- Richard, Myrtle and I (1926)
- Siddhartha by Hermann Hesse (1929, as translator)
- A True Story in Three Parts and a Postscript, All of Them Facile Rubbish (1930)
- Celeste and Other Sketches (Blackamore Press, 1930)
- Time Regained by Marcel Proust (1931, as translator)
- The Other Side (1937)

== Sources ==
- Klaidman, Stephen (2013). Sydney and Violet: Their Life with T.S. Eliot, Proust, Joyce and the Excruciatingly Irascible Wyndham Lewis. New York: Nan A. Talese. ISBN 9780385534093.
- Clémentine, Robert, ed. (1976). Aldous Huxley, exhumations: correspondance inédite avec Sydney Schiff, 1925-1937. Paris: Didier. OCLC 3232251.
- Davenport-Hines, Richard (2006). A Night at the Majestic: Proust and the great modernist party of 1922. London: Faber and Faber. ISBN 0571220088.
- Jacobs, Arthur (1986). Arthur Sullivan. Oxford: Oxford University Press. ISBN 0192820338.
- Richardson, John (2007). A Life of Picasso: The triumphant years: 1917-1932. London: Jonathan Cape. ISBN 9780224031219.
