= The Apes of God =

1930 novel by Wyndham Lewis

- First edition
- Author: Wyndham Lewis
- Illustrator: Wyndham Lewis
- Language: English
- Publisher: The Arthur Press
- Publication date: 3 June 1930 (Arthur Press; limited edition); 1932 (Robert M. McBride & Co.; Nash & Grayson)
- Publication place: United Kingdom
- Media type: Print
- Pages: 625

The Apes of God is a novel by the British artist and writer Wyndham Lewis. It was published in a limited edition in 1930, and then more widely in 1932. The Apes of God is a satire of London's contemporary literary and artistic scene. The Sitwells, Gertrude Stein, James Joyce, and Virginia Woolf and the Bloomsbury group are among the writers satirised.

== Plot summary ==
The novel is set in 1926, leading up to the General Strike in May. In an episodic structure, the story follows a young simpleton called Dan Boleyn as he travels the London art world. Dan follows the directions of an infatuated sixty-year-old albino, Horace Zagreus, who believes him to be a genius. The 'Apes of God' that he meets are imitators of true creators; they are characterised as "prosperous mountebanks who alternately imitate and mock at and traduce those figures they at once admire and hate." (p. 123) In the story Zagreus is presented as a character that is only the imitator of another character, Pierpoint, who appears to be the origin of all the ideas that circulate in the society depicted in the novel. Pierpoint, though often mentioned and often maligned, never appears in the novel. He is described as "a painter turned philosopher" (p. 129), a description that could be applied to Lewis himself (his 1927 book, Time and Western Man, contains a great deal of philosophical arguments).

== Setting ==
A contributing basis on which the story was constructed was Lewis' belief that the English Victorian past constricts the "revolutionary consciousness", which potentially could be expressed through modern art and literature.

Lewis's "enemies", such as his patron Sidney Schiff (and his wife), Edward Wadsworth (a fellow Vorticist) and John Rodker, along with members of the Bloomsbury Group, including Lytton Strachey, are recognisable under fictional names and are treated with savage humour. The longest chapter, 'Lord Osmund's Lenten Party' (over 250 pages), is a satirical account of a fancy-dress party held by three members of the 'Finnian Shaw' family, who are modelled on the Sitwell family, Osbert, Edith and Sacheverell.

His pupil Richard Wyndham is portrayed as the character Richard Whittingdon. In response Wyndham offered two of Lewis's paintings for sale in The Times personal column, describing them by size rather than description.

The political and cultural 'diagnosis' of England that the novel aspires to make is partly a development of the ideas put forward by Lewis in his 1926 book, The Art of Being Ruled.
