= Ezra Pound (Lewis) =

1939 painting by Wyndham Lewis

- Artist: Wyndham Lewis
- Year: 1939
- Medium: Oil on canvas
- Dimensions: 76.2 cm × 101.6 cm (30.0 in × 40.0 in)
- Location: Tate; London

Ezra Pound is a portrait of the American poet Ezra Pound, made by his friend Wyndham Lewis in 1939.

Lewis began as an avant-garde painter and became friends with Pound in 1909 or 1910. In 1914, they co-founded the art movement Vorticism. Due to a lack of commercial success, Lewis turned to writing, which became his main means of expression from the 1920s. He created some later paintings, most notably portraits in oil of his avant-gardist friends. These included portraits of T. S. Eliot, Stephen Spender and Pound. He made sketches of James Joyce but never painted him.

Lewis had made a three-quarter-length portrait of a standing Pound which was exhibited in 1919 but is lost. In the 1920s, Lewis was critical of Pound's writings, but eventually decided to celebrate him with another portrait, which he finished in 1939. A watercolour sketch and a crayon study of the head for the 1939 portrait are both dated 1938.

The portrait of Pound shows the poet leaning back in a chair with closed eyes. Beside him is a table with newspapers. The composition is based on diagonal lines formed by Pound's reclining body, offset by vertical lines in the image's left side.

The painter Walter Sickert saw the painting in 1939 and sent a telegram to Lewis where he declared him the greatest portraitist of all time. Tate in London bought the work the same year.
