= Blasting and Bombardiering =

1937 autobiography by Wyndham Lewis

- First edition
- Author: Wyndham Lewis
- Illustrator: Wyndham Lewis
- Cover artist: Wyndham Lewis
- Language: English
- Publisher: Eyre & Spottiswoode (UK)
- Publication date: 1937
- Publication place: United Kingdom

Blasting and Bombardiering is the autobiography of the English painter, novelist, and satirist Percy Wyndham Lewis. It was published in 1937. It was in this work that Lewis first identified the critically oft-mentioned "Men of 1914" group of himself, Ezra Pound, T. S. Eliot, and James Joyce.
