= Portrait of T. S. Eliot =

1938 painting by Wyndham Lewis

- Artist: Wyndham Lewis
- Year: 1938
- Medium: Oil on canvas
- Dimensions: 133.3 cm × 85.5 cm (52.5 in × 33.7 in)
- Location: Durban Art Gallery, Durban

Portrait of T. S. Eliot is a 1938 painting by Wyndham Lewis, depicting the US-born British writer T. S. Eliot. It received publicity when it was rejected by the Royal Academy of Arts. Eliot praised the painting and it became one of Lewis' most celebrated works. It was bought by the Durban Art Gallery, in Durban.

== Description ==
The portrait shows Eliot from the front as he sits in an armchair, dressed in a lounge suit and a waistcoat. His hands are crossed and he has a serious facial expression. The shapes that make up the painting are stylised; The Guardian describes Eliot's face as "a jigsaw puzzle of shadowy half-moons and sharp planes". In the background, on each side of the armchair, are abstract shapes reminiscent of smoke plumes. The background has been interpreted as an expression of experimental ideas and as two pillars symbolising the male and female sides of creativity, represented by a phallus and a bird's nest.

== Reception ==
Lewis submitted the portrait to the 1938 exhibition of the Royal Academy of Arts, knowing it would be rejected. The rejection caused a reaction from the media and gave Lewis attention from a wider public. Augustus John resigned from the academy in reaction to the rejection. The phallic shape in the background has been given as a reason for the rejection.

Eliot commended the painting in a letter to Lewis on 21 April 1938: "It seems to me a very good portrait, and one by which I am quite willing that posterity should know me, if it takes any interest in me at all ... and I certainly have no desire, now, that my portrait should be painted by any painter whose portrait of me would be accepted by the Royal Academy." According to The Independent, the "aura of scandal" around the painting has made it "perhaps the most celebrated" work by Lewis.

== Provenance ==
The Durban Art Gallery in Durban, South Africa, purchased the portrait in 1939 for £250. At that time, members of the Royal Academy could charge up to £3000 for a portrait. It was displayed in London in 2008, when it was part of an exhibition at the National Portrait Gallery. In 2018 it was shown at the Royal Academy of Arts as part of the exhibition The Great Spectacle: 250 Years of the Royal Academy Summer Exhibition.

== Related paintings ==
Lewis made a study for the portrait earlier in 1938, showing Eliot's upper body against a blank background. This painting is kept at the Eliot House at Harvard University. He made another portrait of Eliot in 1949, not long before Lewis became blind, and it was likely the last portrait he completed.
