= The Wild Body =

First edition (UK)

The Wild Body is a series of short stories by Wyndham Lewis that appeared in English and American publications between 1917 and 1922. Nine short stories comprise a series that follows the narrator Ker-Orr (the projected persona of Lewis himself) in his adventures around Brittany. The first of the series, A Soldier of Humour, first appeared in the December 1917 and January 1918 editions of American Literary publication The Little Review. Other stories in the collection are: Beau Sejour, The Cornac and His Wife, The Death of the Ankou, Franciscan Adventures, Brotcotnaz, Inferior Religions and The Meaning of the Wild Body. A later story, Sigismund, was written in 1922 and appeared in Arts and Letters. The final story is You Broke My Dream also written in 1922. The collected short stories were published in a single edition by Chatto & Windus of London in 1927, and Harcourt Brace of New York in 1928.

== Literary context ==
Wyndham Lewis helped pioneer Vorticism, a modernist movement in British art and poetry in the early 20th century and founded the Rebel Art Centre in 1914. Many British artists that had allied themselves with Lewis and the vortices movement attended the centre which was opposed to the Italian futurists movement. American literary agitator Ezra Pound also aligned himself to Lewis's cause. Lewis objected to the futurist celebration of the machine age and was repelled by vague and indistinct form preferring structural clarity which is to be found in the vivid character descriptions, powerful metaphors and crystal-clear imagery of The Wild Body. He hoped Vorticism would help depict rapidly changing social constructs of modern life.

Aligned with Ezra Pound, Lewis was editor, designer and author of the art manifesto magazine Blast that was at the centre of the Vorticism movement. His aim along with the likes of Pound, James Joyce and T. S. Eliot was to stand for a daring and original engagement of art and literature. The Wild Body represents an evolution of the writing ability of Wyndham Lewis and a literary crystallising of the vorticist movement in modernist literature depicting the "itinerant acrobats and assorted eccentrics he encountered during his travels in Brittany" in the opening decades of the 20th century and decanting the heady draught of modernism at its zenith moment.

In The Wild Body Lewis anticipates the absurdism of Eugene Ionesco and the existentialism of Albert Camus in the savage, wretched effigies of poverty stricken Breton in Bestre and Brotcotnaz and the no less absurd sophistication of Sigismund and You Broke My Dream. The comedy of The Wild Body lies in the separation of mind and body, as with Henri Bergson's epistemology on the comic that states that a noble mind is invariably let down by the ridiculous human form. Lewis was informed by the grotesques of Leonardo da Vinci and so this was reflected in the biting satire of his caricatures.

== The Stories ==
A Soldier of Humour - Set in Spain in the Pyrenneeen region in a seedy hotel: The Fonda Del Mundo, (as opposed to the subsequent 6 stories in the Kerr-Orr sequence which are set in Brittany). The protagonist, Kerr-Orr is loosely based on Lewis himself. The character relates to Lewis in that his mother and Kerr-Orr's mother were their "Principal parent" and acted as benefactor to enable travel around Europe. The character description centres around the dichotomy between savagery and humour. "My body is large, white and savage. But all fierceness has become transformed into laughter ... Everywhere where I would formerly fly at throats, I now howl with laughter.".

Lewis focuses on dualities: duality of nationality, French and American, English and French, English and American and French and Spanish. The duality between the physical and the mechanical and that between savagery and humour. In his exchange with the pseudo-American Frenchman the pugilism they play out is a satirical affront of nationalities and languages and it is conveyed in a semi-stream of consciousness style characteristically belonging to the modernist technique perfected by James Joyce and William Faulkner among others.

The story is a colourful and vibrant description of alien nationalities seen from the perspective of an outsider, one detached from the local populace but with an understanding of the language. From this perspective the characters lose their humanity and resemble flesh-bound machines. Kerr-Orr even describes himself thus: "This forked, strange-scented, blond-skinned, gut bag, with its two bright rolling marbles with which it sees ... I hang somewhere in its midst operating it with detachment.".

Beau Séjour -

Bestre -

The Cornac and His Wife -

The Death of the Ankou -

Franciscan Adventures -

Brotcotnaz -

Inferior Religions -

The Meaning of The Wild Body -

Sigismund -

You Broke My Dream -
