= 330th Siege Battery, Royal Garrison Artillery =

Artillery unit of the British Army

330th Siege Battery, RGA
- Cap Badge of the Royal Regiment of Artillery
- Active: 12 December 1916–21 June 1919
- Country: United Kingdom
- Branch: British Army
- Role: Long-range artillery
- Size: Battery
- Part of: Royal Garrison Artillery
- Engagements: Battle of Passchendaele

The 330th Siege Battery (330th SB) was a long-range artillery unit of Britain's Royal Garrison Artillery raised during World War I. It saw active service on the Western Front from early 1917 to the Armistice in 1918, and was heavily engaged in the Battle of Passchendaele.

== Mobilisation and training ==
During World War I the demands of trench warfare required large quantities of heavy and siege artillery. In the British Army these guns were manned by units of the Royal Garrison Artillery (RGA). By late 1916 the flow of volunteers to 'Kitchener's Army' was long past, and new units were being formed from wartime conscripts. On 12 December 1916 20 new siege batteries to be equipped with 6-inch howitzers were raised at Prees Heath Camp in Shropshire. These were numbered 318–337. Among the officers appointed to the new 330th Siege Bty was the artist and writer Wyndham Lewis, who documented his time with the battery as a 2nd Lieutenant. The other subalterns were a trainee solicitor, a surveyor, a schoolmaster and a bank clerk.

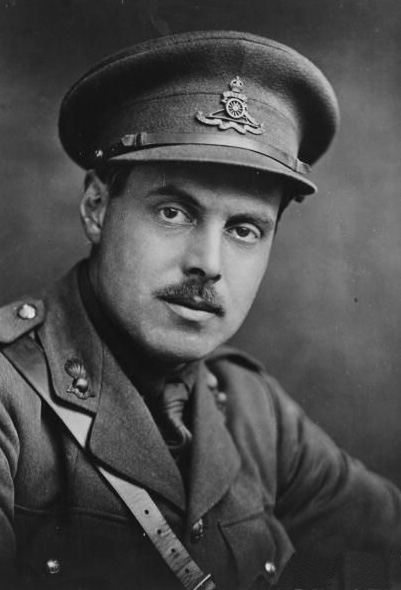
2nd Lt Wyndham Lewis, one of the early officers of the battery.

From Prees Heath 330th SB moved to Horsham in Sussex in mid-February 1917 and then to Aldershot in March. The training consisted of gun and battery drills, plus route marches. In April it moved to the artillery camp at Lydd on the Kent coast where pre-deployment training was carried out, with live firing and instruction in building dugouts. The battery moved to Portsmouth later that month. It completed its training and was ordered to join the British Expeditionary Force (BEF) on the Western Front.

== Service ==
The personnel of 330th SB, 6 officers and 154 other ranks (ORs) under the command of Captain 'Harry' Fenner, a prewar Special Reserve officer in the Cork RGA (SR), embarked aboard SS Viper at Southampton on 24 May 1917 and landed at Le Havre next day. From Le Havre the men were sent by train and motor lorry to join 69th Heavy Artillery Group (HAG) at La Clytte in Flanders, arriving on 5 June. Here the officers and ORs were split into small detachments, each of which was attached to a battery or headquarters (HQ) for their introduction to the front line (216th, 224th, 258th and 291st SBs and HQs 1st and 69th HAGs).

=== Flanders coast ===
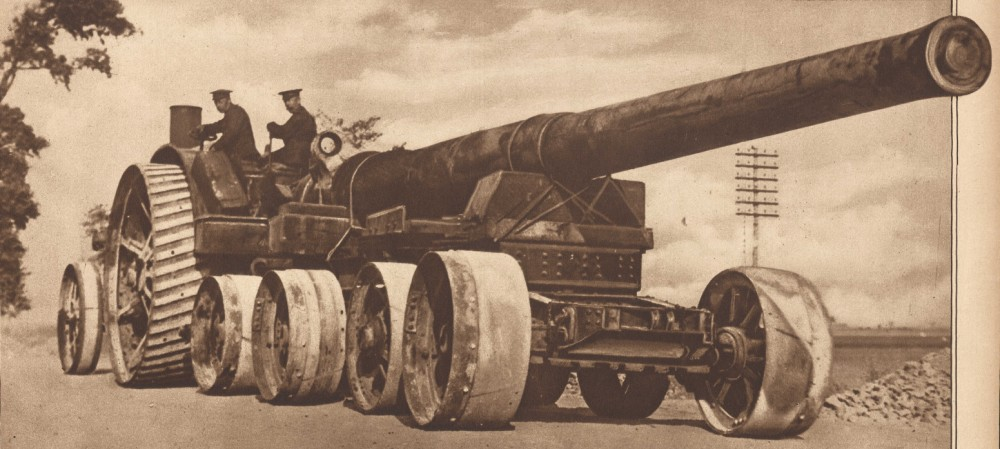
A Royal Navy 7.5-inch Mk III naval gun from the decommissioned warship HMS Swiftsure being transported in Flanders in early 1917. Photograph by Ernest Brooks.

On 12 June Capt Fenner exchanged commands with Major A.C. Tod (a prewar Territorial Force (TF) officer) of 325th SB. 330th Siege Bty reassembled at La Clytte on 15 June and was then employed as working parties until 25 June, when it went by motor buses to XV Corps' Siege Park at Coxyde on the Flemish coast. It was lodged in dugouts among the sand dunes at Oostduinkerke, being employed under 32nd HAG to construct gun pits and battery positions. On 7 July it moved to billets at the Royal Navy's Siege Gun HQ, where the men were put to mounting 7.5-inch guns. The area was under enemy shellfire, and the battery began to suffer its first few fatalities. The first gun was mounted on 26 July, but the others were delayed because the holding-down plates supplied did not fit the guns. No 2 gun was mounted on Swiftsure Battery on 7 August, and the last of four guns by 24 August.

=== Ypres ===
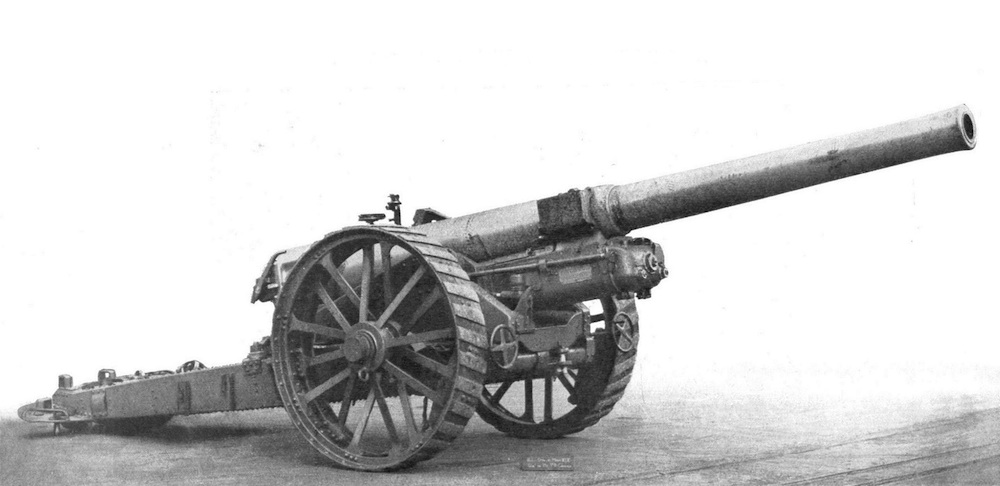

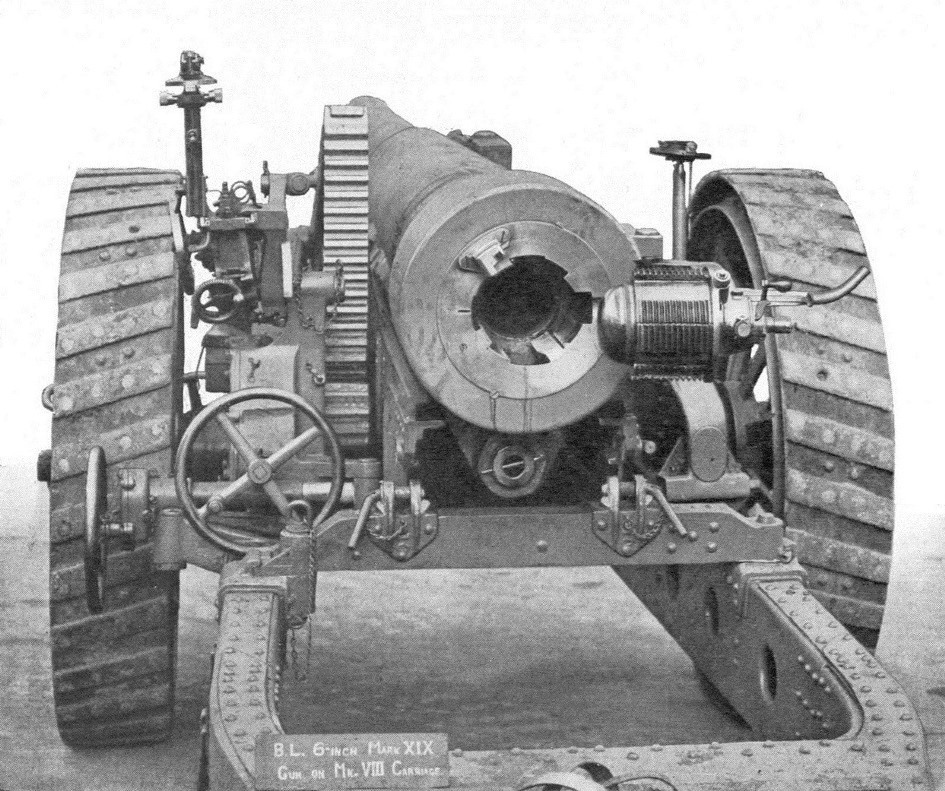

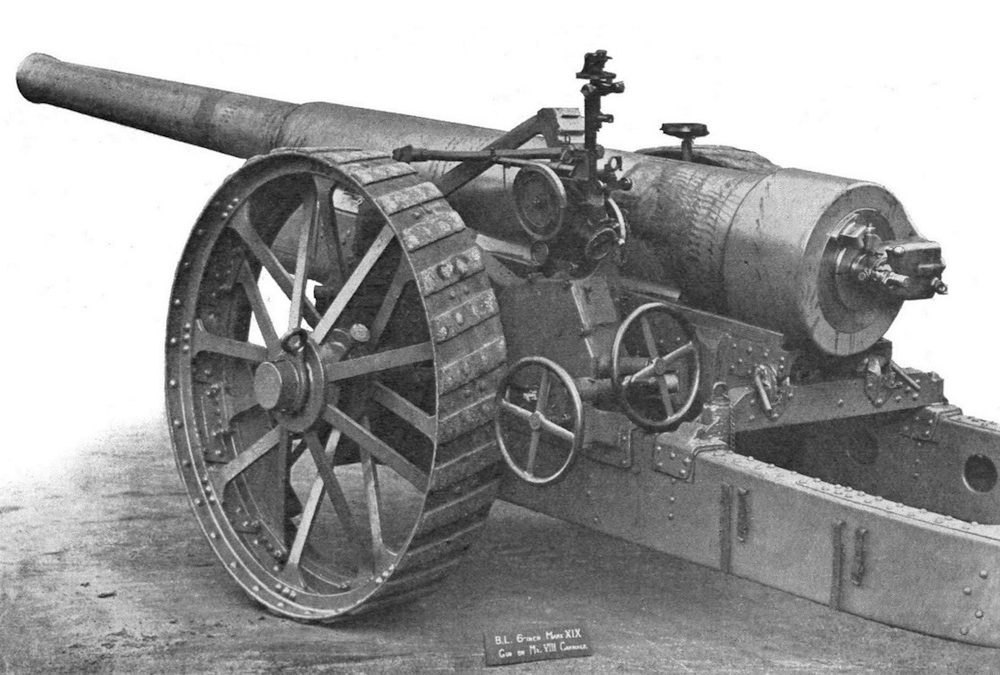

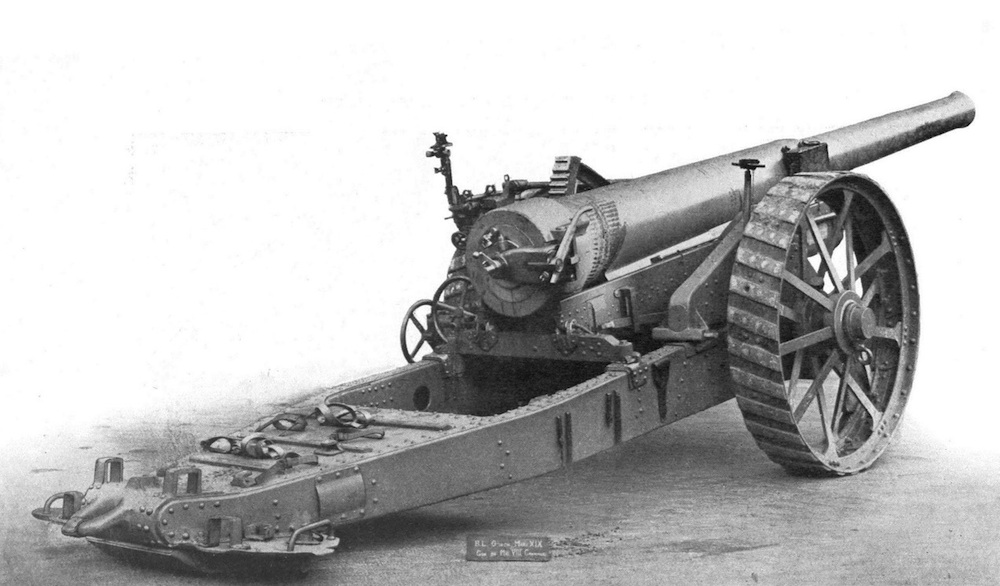
6-inch Mk XIX gun as used by the battery.

On 26 August Acting Capt 'Jim' Hindson arrived to take command of 330th SB and was promoted to Acting Major the following day. He had enlisted in the 2nd East Riding RGA (Volunteers) in 1903, and on the outbreak of war he had been a company quartermaster-sergeant in the East Riding RGA (TF) manning coat defence batteries; he had been commissioned in July 1915. He remained the battery's officer commanding until the end of the war. While at the Siege Camp the battery had begun receiving stores to enable it to be equipped with four long range (up to 18,750 yd/17,140 m) 6-inch guns Mk XIX, rather than the 6-inch howitzers originally planned. On 29 August the gunners and stores were withdrawn and moved by stages to arrive at Eecke on 1 September. This was behind the Ypres Salient, where the Third Ypres Offensive was raging. On 6 September a party left to draw the guns and equipment from the base at Calais while the rest of the battery began preparing positions under orders of 10th HAG. The gun platforms arrived on 12 September and the guns were brought up by caterpillar tractors the following day. By 16 September these were emplaced, the sights fitted, and ammunition had arrived, with a 15-man detachment of the British West Indies Regiment to assist in ammunition handling. The battery began visual registration of its first target: the gasometer at Zonnebeke. The battery officers took turns with those of the other batteries of 10th HAG in acting as forward observation officers (FOOs) in observation posts (OPs) such as 'Rectory OP' in a captured German pillbox on Westhoek Ridge or 'China Wall' in another pillbox. On 17 September the battery fired 177 rounds of high explosive (HE) and shrapnel shells on roads and railways behind enemy lines. This 'isolating fire' was part of the preparation for the next phase of the offensive, the Battle of the Menin Road Ridge, in which the battery supported I ANZAC Corps. From noon on 17 to noon on 18 September the battery fired 271 rounds on the same tasks, and over the next 48 hours fired another 752 rounds, also firing a few shrapnel rounds at Zonnebeke gasometer to check its registration. The attack was launched at 05.40 on 20 September, and two Australian divisions of I ANZAC Corps advanced to the north of the Menin Road and captured the first part of Polygon Wood. Although hampered by a broken platform at No 1 gun, which had to be replaced by a strengthened one from the workshops, 330th SB continued some harassing fire (HF) tasks on road junctions and railways over the following days. From 23 September this firing was increased to 120 rounds per day and targets were expanded to include two German kite balloon ground stations. The next stage of the offensive, the Battle of Polygon Wood was launched at 05.50 on 26 September, with I ANZAC Corps seizing the remainder of Polygon Wood and advancing to the outskirts of Zonnebeke. In addition to its assigned tasks, 330th SB responded to calls to fire on two parties of enemy infantry estimated at 100- and 500-strong: the British artillery's response to such calls effectively broke up the anticipated German counter-attacks. 330th SB fired 213 rounds in the 24 hours to 18.00 on 26 September.

In preparation for Second Army's next 'bite-and-hold' attack (the Battle of Broodseinde) 330th SB continued its HF fire on roads, including the approaches to Moorslede beyond the Passchendaele Ridge, and night tasks on the roads between Mispelaere Cabaret, Droogenbroodhoek Crossroads and Keiberg Crossroads. Mispelaere Cabaret was registered with the aid of a British observation balloon. The success of the preceding attacks meant that German positions were now at extreme range even for 330th SB's 6-inch guns. Large amounts of artillery had to be moved forward, and on 2 October, while two guns registered a new target at De Knoet Farm the other two were taken out of action and moved to a new position previously occupied by another battery. While these were being emplaced the new gun position was bombed by a hostile aircraft, and 11 gunners were wounded when a bomb fell between Nos 3 and 4 guns, setting light to ammunition; the other guns apparently joined this position later. Whereas the two previous attacks had been preceded by heavy bombardments, Broodseinde was a surprise, with only the normal HF and counter-battery (CB) artillery fire until the moment of the attack (06.00 on 4 October), when the whole weight of Second Army's artillery came down. 330th SB fired its isolation programme on Moorslede, the Zonnebeke road and Zonnebeke village in support of I ANZAC Corps, whose troops captured Broodseinde Ridge. Second Army attacked again on 9 October (the Battle of Poelcappelle). In addition to its HF tasks 330th SB responded to calls from FOOs to fire on enemy lorries, a group of houses, and a group of enemy troops massing for a counter-attack, firing 280 rounds in the day. However, the weather had now broken, rain hampering the preparations for the attack (HE shells buried in the mud and had little effect) and I ANZAC Corps' attack only succeeded in capturing part of the first objective. The attack on 12 October (the First Battle of Passchendaele) was badly affected by mud, the infantry attacks being made in frightful conditions and achieving little. 330th SB's contribution was 228 rounds fired on the Moorslede–Droogenbroodhoek road, enemy troops massing at the approaches to Moorslede village, a German HQ and a hostile battery. By now the Germans had increased their own CB efforts, and even without direct observation were able to inflict serious damage on the close-packed British gun lines near the Menin Road by means of 'area shoots'. From June to October the battery suffered a total of 4 killed and 19 wounded, including two officers wounded when the battery HQ dugout received a shell hit on 24 October. 330th. I ANZAC Corps did not take part in the attack on 26 October (the start of the Second Battle of Passchendaele) but 10th HAG fired in support of the neighbouring Canadian Corps, 330th SB carrying out isolation fire with a double allocation of ammunition. The Canadians reached the outskirts of Passchendaele itself on 30 October.

=== Winter 1917–8 ===
On 1 November 73rd HAG took over command of 10th HAG's batteries, still under I ANZAC Corps' Heavy Artillery. As the Canadians fought their way into Passchendaele, 330th SB continued interdicting Moorslede and the Menin Road, and fired visually on enemy balloon sites. The offensive was closed down after the attack of 10 November, but the battery continued its harassing fire until mid-December.

Wyndham Lewis had gone on leave on 25 October and had not returned, having secured a position as an official War artist with the Canadian War Records Office. Lewis was an abrasive character and did not get on with his fellow officers in 330th SB, whom he considered his social inferiors. Nor was he as conscientious in his duties as some of them, and there seems to have been no objection from the battery when he was posted away.

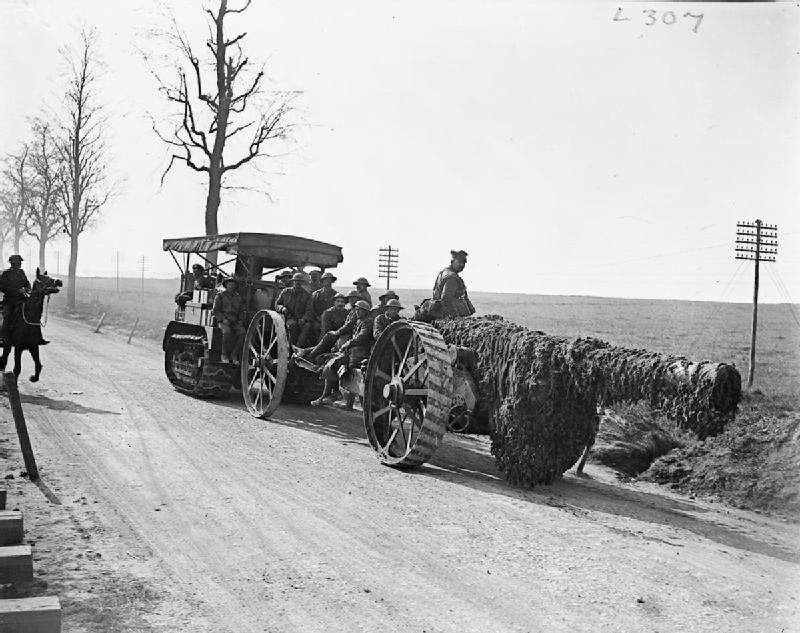
Camouflaged 6-inch Mk XIX gun being towed by a Holt 75 tractor.

On 16 December 330th SB moved No 4 gun to a new position at 'Railway Wood', just north of the Menin Road east of Ypres, and it came into action next day. No 3 gun was sent back to the workshops during the night of 17/18 December, and No 2 went up to Railway Wood the following night. No 3 returned from the workshops to the new position on 23/24 December while No 1 went down to the workshops. All four guns were in action from the wood by 2 January 1918, firing a few rounds each day on roads, Ledegem Station and the Roulers–Menin railway, and enemy billeting areas, or occasionally on an enemy battery or balloon site. One of the guns was condemned for barrel wear on 28 January, but was replaced in three days. A new German ammunition dump was shelled, and on 26 February the battery responded with a 4-round salvo to a 'Zone Call' (all guns within range) when a train was spotted.

=== 1918 ===
In December 1917 the heavy artillery of the BEF was reorganised, with HAGs becoming permanent RGA brigades. 330th SB was transferred to the command of 11th Brigade on 20 February 1918, but this made little difference to its routine HF tasks against the railway at Ledegem except that it was called on more frequently for neutralising CB fire when hostile batteries became active, or for firing at balloon sites. Its billets were bombed by enemy aircraft on the night of 26 March and a sergeant was fatally wounded. In a further reorganisation, batteries of 6-inch guns and heavier were being withdrawn from RGA brigades and subordinated directly to 'Army Troops'. On 2 April 330th SB was taken out of action and transferred to Third Army in the Somme area. This entailed moving to Abeele where on 5 April the personnel with four guns and two caterpillar tractors entrained for Candas, north of Amiens, while two steam tractors and the lorries went by road. On 9 April the battery took up its new positions with two guns, while the other two were taken to the workshops and condemned, each having fired around 3000 rounds. On 11 and 12 April the remaining guns registered and then began firing against targets in front of Amiens, including Lamotte-en-Santerre, the roads from Démuin to Beaucourt and Aubercourt to Courcelles, a balloon site, a battery, and the valley south of Démuin. On 15 April the battery was badly shelled and two men were killed.

This attachment did not last long. On 16 April 330th SB was relieved by 499th SB, which took over one gun and the two platforms, which 330th SB replaced from the Siege Park. The two steam tractors took the two condemned guns to be replaced at III Corps' Ordnance Railhead, while the rest of the battery went to Vers. It then marched by way of Soues to Fourth Army Artillery Collecting Area at Morival to refit, where its remaining original gun was condemned for wear. The three replacement guns joined at Morival on 21 April. The battery was billeted at Wanel 27–30 April, then went to Pont-Remy station to entrain its guns (including a replacement from XIX Corps) and caterpillars for First Army. It detrained on 1 May at Bruay, where it came under XIII Corps' Heavy Artillery, being attached to 44th Bde, RGA. On 9 May it relieved 481st SB at Verquigneul, south of Béthune, Left Section exchanging its two guns for those of 481st already in position, Right Section moving in its own guns. The battery began firing from 11 May, its targets being enemy balloon sites and batteries, trains in Illies station, and troops seen resting in an orchard. This established the routine over the following weeks. On 1 June the battery positions were shelled and casualties suffered, and on 3 June it came under the orders of 55th Bde, RGA.

Fifth Army was being reconstituted under new commanders after it had been badly cut up by the German spring offensive in the Somme area. On 1 July it took over XIII Corps from First Army and 330th SB remained part of Fifth Army Troops until the end of the war.

Fourth Army launched the Allies' victorious Hundred Days Offensive at the Battle of Amiens on 8 August, but even before then the Germans had begun withdrawing from positions in front of Fifth Army that they had gained in the spring, which had been under continuous harassing fire since then. Fifth Army began advancing on 18 August. Without fighting any major battle, it gained 5 miles (8.0 km) by 6 September, and another 5 miles by 2 October. Thereafter the pursuit of the retreating Germans accelerated, with Fifth Army liberating Lille on 17 October. When there was a pause at a defended river line, there was time to bring up heavier guns for CB and HF tasks (though care was taken to avoid shelling villages and towns where French civilians might be sheltering). However, although the lighter RGA brigades could play some part in the advance, the difficulties of moving up the heavier guns and ammunition over cratered roads and blown bridges meant that they had little role to play in the final weeks before the Armistice with Germany came into force on 11 November.

=== Post-Armistice ===
In the interim order of battle for the postwar RGA proposed in May 1919, 330th SB was to become 105th Bty, XXVII Brigade, RGA. However, this was rescinded after the Treaty of Versailles was signed, and 330th SB was disbanded at Dover on 21 June 1919.
