= The Surrender of Barcelona =

Painting by Wyndham Lewis

- Artist: Wyndham Lewis
- Year: 1934–1937
- Medium: Oil on canvas
- Dimensions: 83.8 cm × 59.7 cm (33.0 in × 23.5 in)
- Location: Tate; London

The Surrender of Barcelona, also known as The Siege of Barcelona, is an oil on canvas painting by the British artist Wyndham Lewis, from 1934-1937. It is held at the Tate galleries.

== Description and history ==
The painting shows the fortified medieval city of Barcelona and can be divided into five planes. At the very top, the bright blue sea of the harbour can be seen. Below it are the walls and buildings of the city, stylised as orange-brown geometrical shapes. The next plane consists of three large towers: to the sides two rectangular towers and in the middle a circular one which has been captured by simplified, stick-figure like humans and draped in banners. In front of the towers, a bridge leads over a moat, a dead man hangs from a scaffold, and to the right are a horseman with a yellow standard and a group of followers, all armoured and carrying lances. At the very front are nine men in metal armour and helmets, larger and more detailed than other humans in the picture.

The Surrender of Barcelona was made in 1934–1937 and is also known as The Siege of Barcelona. Wyndham Lewis wrote in 1950: "In the Surrender of Barcelona I set out to paint a Fourteenth Century scene as I should do it could I be transported there, without too great change in the time adjustment involved. So that is a little outside the natural-non-natural categories dominating controversy today." The painting was made around the outbreak of the Spanish Civil War. This conflict was the setting of Lewis' novel The Revenge for Love (1937), but Lewis denied any intended connection between the painting and novel. It is similar to The Armada, another painting Lewis made around the same period, which belongs to the Vancouver Art Gallery in Canada. Jeffrey Meyers calls The Surrender of Barcelona Lewis' masterpiece. He connects it to Barcelona's role as a Republican stronghold and eventual fall in the Spanish Civil War, and writes: "The theme of the picture is the fall of a peaceful open city, the submission to a brutal military occupation, and the effect of war, siege and surrender on a civilian metropolis". The painting was purchased by Tate in 1947.
