= The Crowd (Lewis) =

Painting by Wyndham Lewis

- Artist: Wyndham Lewis
- Year: 1914–1915
- Medium: Oil and graphite on canvas
- Dimensions: 200.7 cm × 153.7 cm (79.0 in × 60.5 in)
- Location: Tate; London

The Crowd is a 1914–1915 abstract painting by the British artist Wyndham Lewis. It is an example of Vorticism, a modern art movement Lewis created. It was first exhibited in March 1915 with The London Group. At one point, it was known as Revolution, due to a misunderstanding that it was inspired by the 1917 October Revolution in Russia. Since 1964, it is in the collection of Tate in London.

== Background ==
Wyndham Lewis painted The Crowd in 1914 or 1915, when he was involved in the British modern art movement Vorticism, of which he was the founder and leading figure. The crowd motif was inspired by the outbreak of World War I, which made him think about power and crowd manipulation. This was the subject of an article he wrote for the second issue of the Vorticist magazine Blast, published in July 1915, titled "The Crowd Master, 1914, London, July". He wrote that "THE CROWD is the first mobilisation of a country".

== Description ==
The Crowd presents an abstract city with highrise buildings and small, heavily stylized human figures. At the top right is a group of structures reminiscent of industrial buildings. People scattered around the picture appear to climb upwards, away from the geometrical enclosure of the city, and towards the structures at the top. At the bottom left is a small group of larger although also stylized figures holding a flag. The Tate gallery label calls them ambiguous and says they "could represent overseers or be inciting the crowd to revolutionary action".

The painting has also been known under the name Revolution. This is because it is undated, and at one point was thought to have been inspired by the October Revolution in Russia of 1917. Stylistically, it appears to be from an earlier date, and it can be identified with Lewis' painting listed as The Crowd at The London Group's exhibition in March 1915. Few large Vorticist paintings survive. Many ended up destroyed, overpainted or have not been possible to trace.

== Reception ==
The Crowd was part of a Lewis retrospective at the Imperial War Museum North in 2017, Wyndham Lewis: Life, Art, War. In conjunction with this, Michael Prodger of the New Statesman wrote that The Crowd is one of Lewis' three most important works and called it "the purest example of his vorticism". Prodger compared it to the film Metropolis by Fritz Lang and paintings by Piet Mondrian. He said it conveys a message about the dehumanised state of modern people, despite that it also may portray an attempted insurrection in the form of the figures at the bottom left. Gareth Harris of the Financial Times wrote that Vorticism never reached the heights of its role model, Italian Futurism and painters such as Gino Severini and Umberto Boccioni, but called The Crowd "a masterly amalgamation of planes and figures, simultaneously interlocking and fracturing".
