= Tarr =

1918 novel by Wyndham Lewis

- 1918 first edition cover
- Author: Wyndham Lewis
- Language: English
- Genre: Modernist Novel
- Publisher: Egoist Press; Alfred A. Knopf
- Publication date: 1918
- Media type: Print book

Tarr is a modernist novel by Wyndham Lewis, written in 1907–11, revised and expanded in 1914–15 and first serialized in the magazine The Egoist from April 1916 until November 1917. The American version was published in 1918, with an English language edition published by the Egoist Press appearing shortly afterwards; Lewis later created a revised and final version published by Chatto & Windus in 1928.

Set in the Bohemianism milieu of pre-war Paris, it presents two artists, the Englishman Tarr and the German Kreisler, and their struggles with money, women and various art and social situations.

The novel abounds in somewhat Nietzschean themes. Tarr, generally thought to be modelled on Lewis himself, displays disdain for the 'bourgeois-bohemians' around him, and vows to 'throw off humour' which he regards—especially in its English form—as a 'means of evading reality' unsuited to ambition and the modern world. This self-conscious attitude and the situations that it brings about are a major source of the novel's pervasive dark humour. Lewis will later clarify that there "is laughter and laughter. That of true satire is as it were tragic laughter". Kreisler, a violent German Romantic of protean energy and a failure as an artist, is in many ways the focus of the novel. An indication of the extremity of his vivid portrait is Lewis' own wondering several years later if he had, in Kreisler, anticipated the personality of Hitler.

== Synopsis ==
The erotically charged novel begins with the English painter Frederick Tarr expounding his theories on art and sex to two successive English acquaintances in Paris. Many Parisian tales ensue.

== Analysis ==
=== Punctuation ===
The American first edition used a punctuation mark (resembling an equals sign: '=') between sentences (after full stops, exclamation marks or question marks; in the earlier Egoist version it had been an m-dash). It has been suggested that these were an attempt by Lewis, an artist, to introduce 'painterly strokes' into literature. This has, however, been disputed by Dr. John Constable, who believes that they are nothing more than a German punctuation mark briefly adopted by Lewis. Lewis himself wrote to Ezra Pound about this when reconstructing missing parts of the manuscript for the U.S. edition: "Were those parallel lines = Quinn mentions kept going by the Egoist, or not? Could not they be disinterred, & used by Knopf?" (Lewis to Pound, October 1917). Evidently not all were disinterred, as large stretches of the book as published are without them.

=== Publication ===
Both the 1918 and 1928 versions of the novel have been in and out of print since its original publication. Oxford University Press has reissued the 1928 text, edited and with notes by Scott W. Klein of Wake Forest University, as part of its Oxford World Classics paperback series in 2010.
