= The Freewoman =

Defunct feminist weekly review

- Editors: Dora Marsden; Mary Gawthorpe
- Categories: Feminist, Humanist
- Frequency: Weekly
- Format: Periodical
- Publisher: Stephen Swift
- Founder: Dora Marsden
- Founded: 1911
- First issue: 23 November 1911
- Final issue Number: 10 October 1912; Volume 2 No. 47
- Country: England
- Language: English

The Freewoman was an English feminist weekly review published between 23 November 1911 and 10 October 1912, and edited by founder Dora Marsden and Mary Gawthorpe.

Although The Freewoman published articles on women's work for wages, housework, motherhood, the suffrage movement, and literature, its notoriety and influence rested on its frank discussions of sexuality, morality, and marriage. The Freewoman urged tolerance for male homosexuality, advocated for free love, and encouraged women to remain unmarried.

Although its circulation probably never exceeded 200, The Freewoman had a significant influence in Modernist circles. Among its contributors were Rebecca West, Bessie Drysdale, H. G. Wells, Edward Carpenter, and Guy Aldred.

In March 1912 Gawthorpe resigned due to poor health and disagreements with Marsden. In September 1912, W H Smith refused to carry The Freewoman, and in October 1912, the journal folded. In June 1913 Marsden started The New Freewoman, which was concerned more with literary modernism than feminism and was funded by Harriet Shaw Weaver. In 1914, The New Freewoman became The Egoist.

== Creation of The Freewoman ==
The Freewoman was a feminist journal/newspaper published during the early twentieth century in Great Britain. Dora Marsden founded The Freewoman in November 1911, and her co-editor was Mary Gawthorpe. Marsden relied on Gawthorpe's name and influence in feminist society to give the paper credibility and popularity. The paper was rooted in more radical feminist ideals that stretched beyond suffrage. Marsden focused the paper around the discussion of sex and the idea of being sexual, which aroused controversy amongst readers. After the first issue of The Freewoman was published, numerous female readers who had grown up during the Victorian era of feminism, thought the views presented did not reflect their ideals of feminism. One of their main objections was the paper's open discussions and references to sex.

The first issue of the paper stated its intention to represent the feminist movement through intellectual thought by contemporary feminists. It touched on issues of marriage, motherhood, sexuality, women's rights, and the domestic man. Some believed that its radical approach exceeded early twentieth century attitudes; however, its influence amongst the feminist and sexual radicals was greater than its small circulation implied.

== The Freewoman ideals ==
According to many of the female readers, The Freewoman expressed beliefs more radical than those held by most feminists during the early twentieth century. In the paper's first issue it discussed the definition of marriage. To The Freewoman marriage did not only mean men and women, nor did it mean that a couple had to have children. To the women who were raised during the Victorian era, this concept of marriage did not register with them. Marriage in the late nineteenth and early twentieth century, meant a man and woman and usually resulted in children. However, with the job opportunities and improved possibility of economic and social independence from the years preceding and during the Great War, some women forged identities separate from the confines of marriage. As feminism began to increase during the twentieth century, the paper characterized these more radical feminists as 'The New Woman'.

The Freewoman began to redefine and transform feminism from being solely related to suffrage and the suffrage movement, but to show feminism in its purest form. It said that feminists needed to strive for more than just the right to vote. Marsden's rather liberal and forward thinking opinion on the definition of feminism is what caused future debates amongst other prominent feminists of the time.

The New Woman was to be a politically, socially and economically independent woman. The Freewoman did not reject the domestic life that most women during the twentieth century lived, but rather used the domestic life of a woman as a tool to show women that they could take an active role in protecting their interests.

In the paper's third issue, it discussed the idea of the domestic man. It suggested that a man could do the work of a woman in the domestic sphere. The goal was to “work towards the evolution of the New Housekeeping.” Its rationale hinged on the argument that the house and its inner workings were no different from that of a restaurant or a milliner's shop. The paper also suggested the idea of communal cooking, saying that if the man and woman divided the household duties, women could work outside of domestic life. This idea of the domestic man also supported the idea of the homosexual family. With a man being able to do the domestic work, it presented the idea that man and man could live as a couple. To say that this openly happened is not likely, however The Freewoman implied and even supported this life style choice. The paper again showed its liberal and progressive beliefs with its idea of the domestic man.

The Freewoman stated that: "It is high time for a reversal of the servile notion of government from above. Free government proceeds from the individual outwards, not from the sum total inwards. It is for this reason that, considering the trend of Syndicalism, we are of the opinion that it is likely to make a far more intimate appeal to the nation than Socialism ever has. Its aims are the same: the means of production and exchange to be the property of the community as a whole, but under Syndicalism the control of conditions of work are to be in the hands of those who perform it."

== The Big Debate ==
With the papers candid nature of expressing many of its beliefs, there were bound to be arguments. One of it biggest criticisms and continuous debates with some readers came from its stance on the suffrage movement. It openly challenged the ideals of the movement and its organization. Despite being co-edited, these views were mainly the opinions of Marsden and not Gawthorpe. With the paper's belief that feminism was more than just the right to vote, its views on the suffrage movement were unlike most feminists in Britain during the twentieth century. During this era women were fighting for the right to vote and to be regarded as political equals amongst men. Not all feminists believed in complete female independence from the strongholds of the normative female life. The Freewoman wanted to stray away from this concept of feminism. It wanted women to not only be politically equal, but economically and socially self-sufficient as well. It rooted its beliefs in complete female independence from the norms of society.

== The Closing Years ==
The publication of The Freewoman did not last long. Its final paper was published in 1912, but was later revived in May 1913 with the new title The New Freewoman. Despite the attempts to revive the paper and inspire more readers, the paper finally ended publication in 1914. Its publication did not reach a large market, mostly due to its views on feminism and the suffrage movement. The paper, but more specifically Dora Marsden's beliefs and opinions were far too liberal and progressive for its early twentieth century audience. The audience was still rather conservative in their views. It would not be until the years of the Great War that women began to take small strides in some of the ideals that The Freewoman expressed. Despite having an extremely small circulation, the paper's strong beliefs and opinions were widely known and debated against and provided the impetus for future feminist activists.

== See also ==
- Women's suffrage publications
