= The Art of Being Ruled =

1926 book by Wyndham Lewis

- Author: Wyndham Lewis
- Language: English
- Genre: Political and social criticism
- Publisher: Chatto & Windus (UK)
- Publication date: 1926
- Media type: Print
- Pages: 434

The Art of Being Ruled is a 1926 work of political and social criticism by the British writer and artist Wyndham Lewis. The book examines the political, social and psychological mechanisms through which individuals are governed in modern industrial society.

== Publication history ==
The book was published in London by Chatto & Windus in 1926; an American edition by Harper & Brothers was published the same year. It grew out of Lewis's much larger projected work, provisionally entitled The Man of the World, which he had been developing during the first half of the 1920s. The original project was eventually divided into separate books, including The Art of Being Ruled, The Lion and the Fox (1927) and Time and Western Man (1927).

== Themes and arguments ==
Louis called the book "the first of my non-fiction books": "in 1926 I began writing about politics, not because I like politics but everything was getting bogged down in them and before you could do anything you had to deal with the politics with which it was encrusted."

The start of the book relates the conflict between Western liberal democracies, weakened after World War I, and the authoritarianism of Italy and Russia. The ideas of Pierre-Joseph Proudhon, Georges Sorel and Karl Marx are his lens. Lewis ultimately preferred an authoritarian government that, if run "responsibly", would offer the same comfortable life for the common man as democracy, but that would give the intelligentsia, including artists like him, a prominent role. "Instead of a vast organization to exploit the weaknesses of the Many," he asked, "should we not possess one for the exploitation of the intelligence of the Few?"
