= Wyndham Lewis =

English painter and writer (1882–1957)

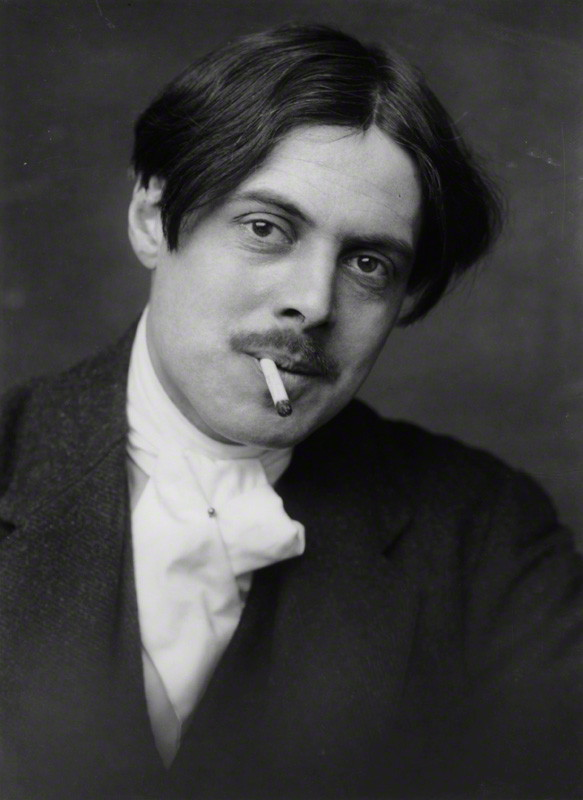
- Lewis in 1913
- Born: Percy Wyndham Lewis; 18 November 1882; Amherst, Nova Scotia, Canada
- Died: 7 March 1957 (aged 74); London, England
- Education: Slade School of Fine Art, University College London
- Known for: Painting, poetry, literature, criticism
- Movement: Vorticism
- Spouse: Gladys Anne Hoskins (m. 1930)
- Partner: Iris Barry

Percy Wyndham Lewis (18 November 1882 – 7 March 1957) was a Canadian-born British writer, painter and critic. He was a co-founder of the Vorticist movement in art and edited Blast, the literary magazine of the Vorticists.

Lewis is known for his novels Tarr (1918) and The Apes of God (1930), short story collection The Wild Body (1927), and autobiography Blasting and Bombardiering (1937).

== Life and career ==
=== Early life ===
Percy Wyndham Lewis was born on 18 November 1882, reputedly on his father's yacht off the coast of the Canadian province of Nova Scotia. His English mother, Anne Stuart Lewis (née Prickett), and American father, Charles Edward Lewis, separated in about 1893. His mother subsequently returned to England. Lewis was educated in England at Rugby School and then, from 16, at the Slade School of Fine Art, University College London, but left for Paris without finishing his course. He spent most of the 1900s travelling around Europe and studying art in Paris. Whilst there he attended lectures by Henri Bergson on process philosophy.

=== Early work and development of Vorticism (1908–1915) ===
Wyndham Lewis, 1912, The Dancers

Wyndham Lewis, c.1914–15, Workshop (Tate, London)

In 1908 Lewis moved to London, where he would reside for much of his life. In 1909 he published his first work, accounts of his travels in Brittany, in Ford Madox Ford's The English Review. He was a founding member of the Camden Town Group, which brought him into close contact with the Bloomsbury Group, particularly Roger Fry and Clive Bell, with whom he soon fell out.

In 1912 he exhibited his work at the second Post-Impressionist exhibition: Cubo-Futurist illustrations to Timon of Athens and three major oil paintings. In 1912 he was commissioned to produce a decorative mural, a drop curtain, and more designs for The Cave of the Golden Calf, an avant-garde nightclub and cabaret on Heddon Street.

From 1913 to 1915 Lewis developed the style of geometric abstraction for which he is best known today, which his friend Ezra Pound dubbed "Vorticism". Lewis sought to combine the strong structure of Cubism, which he found was not "alive", with the liveliness of Futurist art, which lacked structure. The combination was a strikingly dramatic critique of modernity. In his early visual works Lewis may have been influenced by Bergson's process philosophy. Though he was later savagely critical of Bergson, he admitted in a letter to Theodore Weiss (19 April 1949) that he "began by embracing his evolutionary system." The German philosopher Friedrich Nietzsche was an equally important influence.

Lewis had a brief tenure at Roger Fry's Omega Workshops, but left after a quarrel with Fry over a commission to provide wall decorations for the Daily Mail Ideal Home Exhibition, which Lewis believed Fry had misappropriated. He and several other Omega artists started a competing workshop called the Rebel Art Centre. The Centre operated for only four months, but it gave birth to the Vorticist group and its publication, Blast. In Blast Lewis formally expounded the Vorticist aesthetic in a manifesto, distinguishing it from other avant-garde practices. He also wrote and published a play, Enemy of the Stars. It is a proto-absurdist, Expressionist drama. The Lewis scholar Melania Terrazas identifies it as a precursor to the plays of Samuel Beckett.

=== World War I (1915–1918) ===
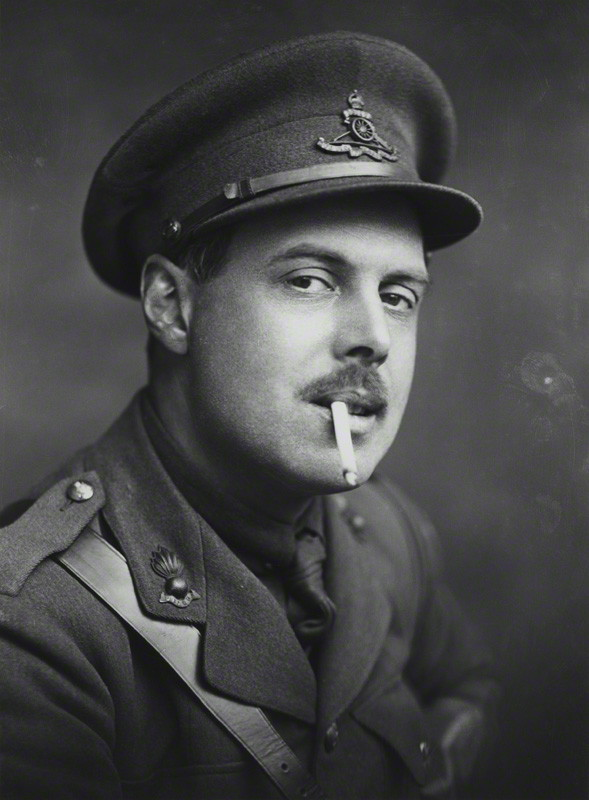
Wyndham Lewis, photograph by George Charles Beresford, 1917

In 1915 the Vorticists held their only British exhibition before the movement broke up, largely as a result of the First World War. Lewis himself joined up under the Derby Scheme in March 1916 just before conscription was brought in. He was assigned to the Royal Garrison Artillery (RGA) and after training was posted to 183rd Siege Battery, RGA, forming at Weymouth, Dorset, in which he served as a Bombardier. At the second attempt he was accepted as an officer cadet and went to the cadet school at Trowbridge before his battery deployed overseas. On completing his officer training he was commissioned as a 2nd Lieutenant and in January 1917 was posted to the newly-raised 330th Siege Battery, RGA. 330th Siege Battery embarked on 24 May 1917 for the Western Front. It served on the Flanders coast and then at Ypres during the Third Ypres offensive. Much of Lewis's time was spent in Forward Observation Posts looking down at apparently deserted German lines, registering targets and calling down fire from batteries massed around the rim of the Ypres Salient. He wrote vivid accounts of narrow misses and deadly artillery duels, though not all of these can be corroborated.

After the Third Battle of Ypres Lewis was appointed an official war artist for the Canadian and British governments. For the Canadians he painted A Canadian Gun-pit (1918) from sketches made on Vimy Ridge. For the British he painted one of his best-known works, A Battery Shelled (1919), drawing on his own experience at Ypres. Lewis exhibited his war drawings and some other paintings of the war in an exhibition, "Guns", in 1918. Although the Vorticist group broke up after the war, Lewis's patron, John Quinn, organised a Vorticist exhibition at the Penguin Club in New York City in 1917.

Between 1907 and 1911 Lewis had written what would be his first published novel, Tarr, which was revised and expanded in 1914–15 and serialised in the London literary magazine The Egoist from April 1916 to November 1917. It was first published in book form in 1918 by Alfred A. Knopf in New York and by The Egoist in London. It is widely regarded as one of the key texts in literary modernism.

Lewis later documented his experiences and opinions of this period of his life in the autobiographical Blasting and Bombardiering (1937), which covered the time up to 1926.

=== Tyros and writing (1918–1929) ===
Mr Wyndham Lewis as a Tyro, self-portrait, 1921

After the war Lewis resumed his career as a painter with a major exhibition, Tyros and Portraits, at the Leicester Galleries in 1921. "Tyros" were satirical caricatures intended to comment on the culture of the "new epoch" that succeeded the First World War. A Reading of Ovid and Mr Wyndham Lewis as a Tyro are the only surviving oil paintings from this series. Lewis also launched his second magazine, The Tyro, of which there were only two issues. The second (1922) contained an important statement of Lewis's visual aesthetic: "Essay on the Objective of Plastic Art in our Time". It was during the early 1920s that he perfected his incisive draughtsmanship.

By the late 1920s he concentrated on writing. He launched another magazine, The Enemy (1927–1929), largely written by himself and declaring its belligerent critical stance in its title. The magazine and other theoretical and critical works he published from 1926 to 1929 mark a deliberate separation from the avant-garde and his previous associates. He believed that their work failed to show sufficient critical awareness of those ideologies that worked against truly revolutionary change in the West, and therefore became a vehicle for these pernicious ideologies. His major theoretical and cultural statement from this period is The Art of Being Ruled (1926).

Time and Western Man (1927) is a cultural and philosophical discussion that includes penetrating critiques of James Joyce, Gertrude Stein and Ezra Pound that are still read. Lewis also attacked the process philosophy of Bergson, Samuel Alexander, Alfred North Whitehead and others. By 1931 he was advocating the art of ancient Egypt as impossible to surpass.

=== Fiction and political writing (1930–1936) ===
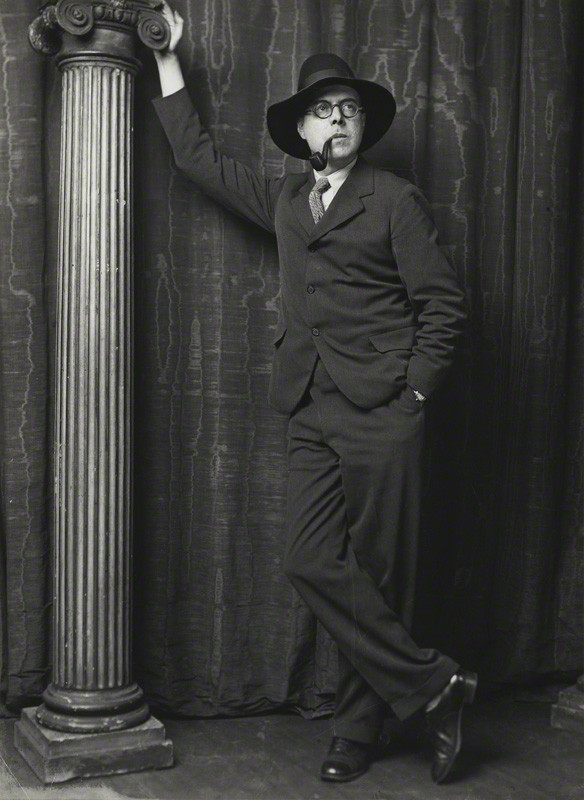
Lewis in 1929, photographed by George Charles Beresford

In 1930 Lewis published The Apes of God, a biting satirical attack on the London literary scene, including a long chapter caricaturing the Sitwell family. The writer Richard Aldington, however, found it "the greatest piece of writing since Ulysses", by James Joyce. In 1937 Lewis published The Revenge for Love, set in the period leading up to the Spanish Civil War and regarded by many as his best novel. It is strongly critical of communist activity in Spain and presents English intellectual fellow travellers as deluded.

Despite serious illness necessitating several operations, he was very productive as a critic and painter. He produced a book of poems, One-Way Song, in 1933, and a revised version of Enemy of the Stars. An important book of critical essays also belongs to this period: Men without Art (1934). It grew out of a defence of Lewis's satirical practice in The Apes of God and puts forward a theory of "non-moral", or metaphysical, satire. The book is probably best remembered for one of the first commentaries on William Faulkner and a famous essay on Ernest Hemingway.

=== Return to painting (1936–1941) ===
Lewis's Ezra Pound, 1919. The portrait is lost.

After becoming better known for his writing than his painting in the 1920s and early 1930s, he returned to more concentrated work on visual art, and paintings from the 1930s and 1940s constitute some of his best-known work. The Surrender of Barcelona (1936–37) makes a significant statement about the Spanish Civil War. It was included in an exhibition at the Leicester Galleries in 1937 that Lewis hoped would re-establish his reputation as a painter. After the publication in The Times of a letter of support for the exhibition, asking for something from the show to be purchased for the national collection (signed by, among others, Stephen Spender, W. H. Auden, Geoffrey Grigson, Rebecca West, Naomi Mitchison, Henry Moore and Eric Gill) the Tate Gallery bought the painting, Red Scene. Like others from the exhibition, it shows an influence from Surrealism and Giorgio de Chirico's metaphysical painting. Lewis was highly critical of the ideology of Surrealism, but admired the visual qualities of some Surrealist art.

During this period Lewis also produced many of his most well-known portraits, including pictures of Edith Sitwell (1923–1936), T. S. Eliot (1938 and 1949), and Ezra Pound (1939). His 1938 portrait of Eliot was rejected by the selection committee of the Royal Academy for their annual exhibition and caused a furore. Augustus John resigned in protest.

=== Second World War and North America (1941–1945) ===
Lewis spent the Second World War in the United States and Canada. In 1941 in Toronto he produced a series of watercolour fantasies centred on themes of creation, crucifixion and bathing.

He grew to appreciate the cosmopolitan and "rootless" nature of the American melting pot, declaring that the greatest advantage of being American was to have "turned one's back on race, caste, and all that pertains to the rooted state." He praised the contributions of African Americans to American culture, and regarded Diego Rivera, David Alfaro Siqueiros and José Clemente Orozco as the "best North American artists," predicting that when "the Indian culture of Mexico melts into the great American mass to the North, the Indian will probably give it its art." He returned to England in 1945.

=== Later life and blindness (1945–1951) ===
By 1951 he was completely blinded by a pituitary tumour that placed pressure on his optic nerve. It ended his career as a painter, but he continued writing until his death. He published several autobiographical and critical works: Rude Assignment (1950), Rotting Hill (1951), a collection of allegorical short stories about his life in "the capital of a dying empire"; The Writer and the Absolute (1952), a book of essays on writers including George Orwell, Jean-Paul Sartre and André Malraux; and the semi-autobiographical novel Self Condemned (1954).

The BBC commissioned Lewis to complete his 1928 work The Childermass, which was published as The Human Age and dramatised for the BBC Third Programme in 1955. In 1956 the Tate Gallery held a major exhibition of his work, "Wyndham Lewis and Vorticism", in the catalogue to which he declared that "Vorticism, in fact, was what I, personally, did and said at a certain period"—a statement which brought forth a series of "Vortex Pamphlets" from his fellow Blast signatory William Roberts.

== Personal life ==
From 1918 to 1921, Lewis lived with Iris Barry, with whom he had two children. He is said to have shown little affection for them.

In 1930, Lewis married Gladys Anne Hoskins (1900–1979), who was affectionately known as Froanna. They lived together for 10 years before marrying, and never had children. Lewis did not tell all of his friends about his marriage, as he was jealous of them meeting her. Froanna modelled for some of his work, and characters in his books reflect her.

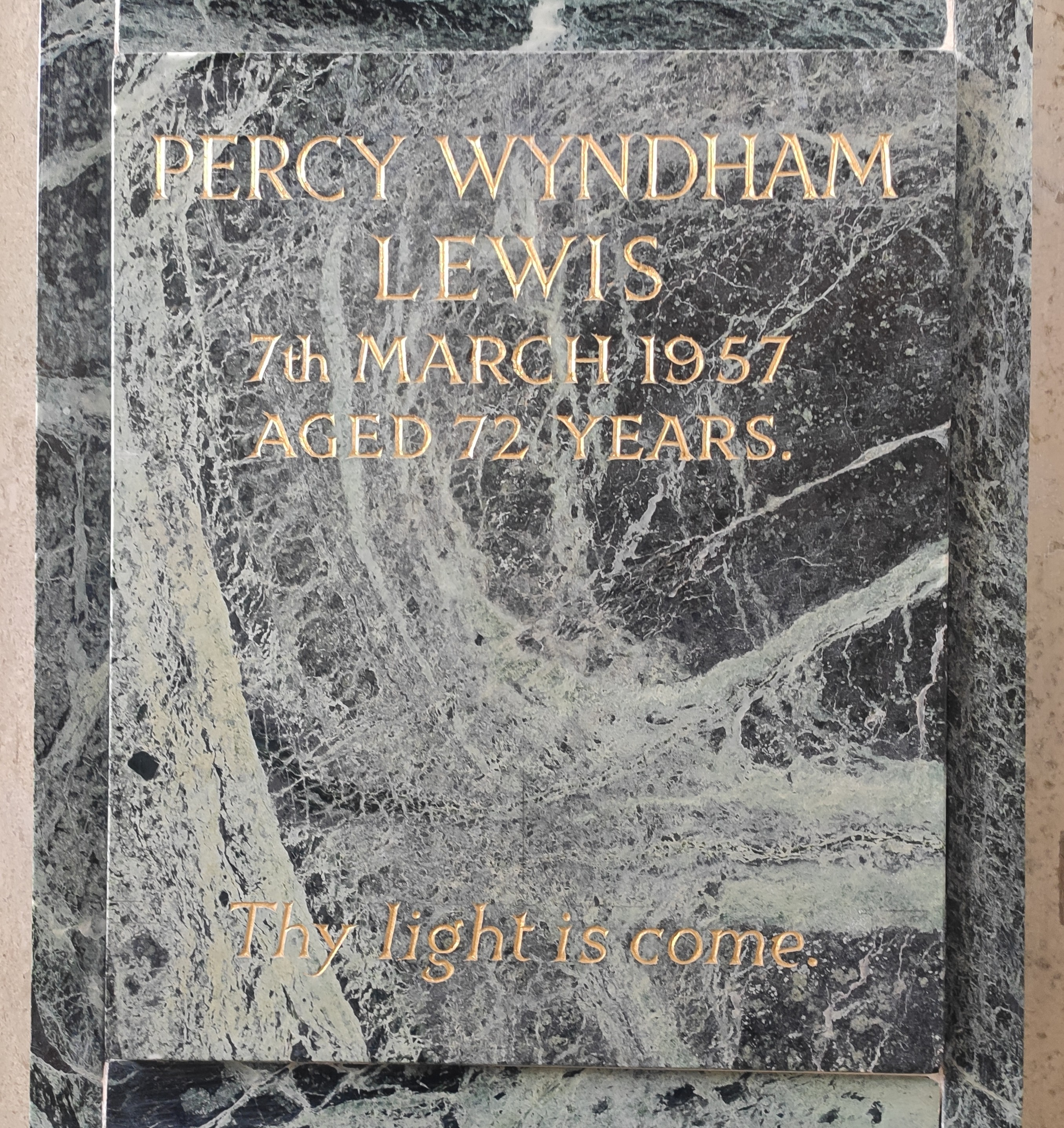
Plaque dedicated to Lewis at Golders Green Crematorium

He died in 1957 and was cremated at Golders Green Crematorium. By the time of his death he had written 40 books.

=== Political views ===
In 1931, after a visit to Berlin, Lewis published Hitler, a book presenting Adolf Hitler as a "man of peace", with members of his party being threatened by communist street violence. His unpopularity among liberals and anti-fascists grew, especially after Hitler came to power in 1933. Following a second visit to Germany in 1937, Lewis changed his views and began to retract his previous political comments. He recognised the reality of Nazi treatment of Jews after a visit to Berlin in 1937. In 1939 he published an attack on antisemitism titled The Jews, Are They Human?, (Note: The title is based on a contemporary best-seller, "The English, Are They Human?" by G. J. Renier.) which was favourably reviewed in The Jewish Chronicle. He also published The Hitler Cult (1939), which firmly revoked his earlier support for Hitler.

Politically, Lewis remained an isolated figure through the 1930s. In Letter to Lord Byron, W. H. Auden called Lewis "that lonely old volcano of the Right." Lewis thought there was what he called a "left-wing orthodoxy" in Britain in the 1930s. He believed it was against Britain's self-interest to ally with the Soviet Union, "which the newspapers most of us read tell us has slaughtered out-of-hand, only a few years ago, millions of its better fed citizens, as well as its whole imperial family."

In Anglosaxony: A League that Works (1941), Lewis reflected on his earlier support for fascism:

Fascism – once I understood it – left me colder than communism. The latter at least pretended, at the start, to have something to do with helping the helpless and making the world a more decent and sensible place. It does start from the human being and his suffering. Whereas fascism glorifies bloodshed and preaches that man should model himself upon the wolf.

His sense that America and Canada lacked a British-type class structure had increased his opinion of liberal democracy, and in the same pamphlet he defends liberal democracy's respect for individual freedom against its critics on both the left and right. In America and Cosmic Man (1949) Lewis argued that Franklin D. Roosevelt, the US president from 1933 to 1945, had successfully managed to reconcile individual rights with the demands of the state.

== Legacy ==
In recent years there has been renewed critical and biographical interest in Lewis and his work, and he is now regarded as a major British artist and writer of the twentieth century. Rugby School hosted an exhibition of his works in November 2007 to commemorate the 50-year anniversary of his death. The National Portrait Gallery in London held a major retrospective of his portraits in 2008. Two years later the Fundación Juan March (Madrid, Spain), held a large exhibition (Wyndham Lewis 1882–1957) featuring a comprehensive collection of Lewis's paintings and drawings. As Tom Lubbock pointed out, it was "the retrospective that Britain has never managed to get together."

In 2010 Oxford World's Classics published a critical edition of the 1928 text of Tarr, edited by Scott W. Klein of Wake Forest University. The Nasher Museum of Art at Duke University held an exhibition entitled "The Vorticists: Rebel Artists in London and New York, 1914–18" from 30 September 2010 through 2 January 2011. The exhibition then travelled to the Peggy Guggenheim Collection, Venice (29 January – 15 May 2011: "I Vorticisti: Artisti ribelli a Londra e New York, 1914–1918") and then to Tate Britain under the title "The Vorticists: Manifesto for a Modern World" between 14 June and 4 September 2011.

Several readings by Lewis are collected on The Enemy Speaks, an audiobook published in compact disc form in 2007 and featuring extracts from "One Way Song" and The Apes of God, as well as radio talks titled "When John Bull Laughs" (1938), "A Crisis of Thought" (1947) and "The Essential Purposes of Art" (1951).

A blue plaque now stands on the house in Kensington, London, where Lewis lived, No. 61 Palace Gardens Terrace.

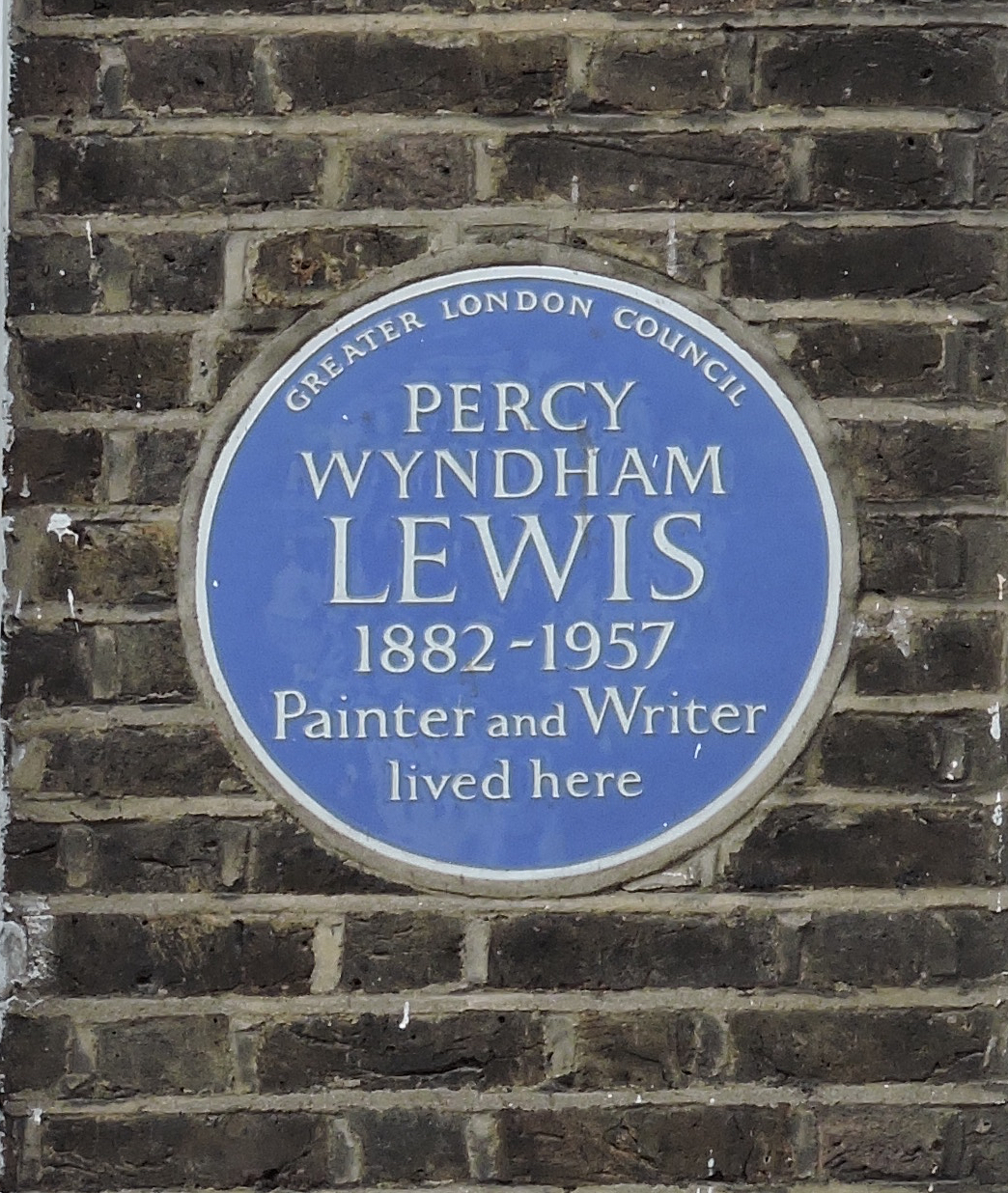
Blue plaque: Wyndham Lewis, 61 Palace Gardens Terrace, London W8

=== Critical reception ===
In his essay "Good Bad Books" George Orwell presents Lewis as the exemplary writer who is cerebral without being artistic. Orwell wrote, "Enough talent to set up dozens of ordinary writers has been poured into Wyndham Lewis's so-called novels… Yet it would be a very heavy labour to read one of these books right through. Some indefinable quality, a sort of literary vitamin, which exists even in a book like [1921 melodrama] If Winter Comes, is absent from them."

In 1932 Walter Sickert sent Lewis a telegram in which he said that Lewis's pencil portrait of Rebecca West proved him to be "the greatest portraitist of this or any other time."

==== Antisemitism ====
For many years Lewis's novels have been criticised for their satirical and hostile portrayals of Jews. Tarr was revised and republished in 1928, giving a new Jewish character a key role in making sure a duel is fought. This has been interpreted as an allegorical representation of a supposed Zionist conspiracy against the West. His literary satire The Apes of God has been interpreted similarly, because many of the characters are Jewish, including the modernist author and editor Julius Ratner, a portrait which blends antisemitic stereotype with the historical literary figures John Rodker and James Joyce.

A key feature of these interpretations is that Lewis is held to have kept his conspiracy theories hidden and marginalised. Since the publication of Anthony Julius's T. S. Eliot, Anti-Semitism, and Literary Form (1995), where Lewis's antisemitism is described as "essentially trivial", this view is no longer taken seriously.

== Books ==
- Tarr (1918) (novel)
- The Caliph's Design : Architects! Where is Your Vortex? (1919) (essay)
- The Art of Being Ruled (1926) (essays)
- The Wild Body: A Soldier of Humour And Other Stories (1927) (short stories)
- The Lion and the Fox: The Role of the Hero in the Plays of Shakespeare (1927) (essays)
- Time and Western Man (1927) (essays)
- The Childermass (1928) (novel)
- Paleface: The Philosophy of the Melting Pot (1929) (essays)
- Satire and Fiction (1930) (criticism)
- The Apes of God (1930) (novel)
- Hitler (1931) (essay)
- The Diabolical Principle and the Dithyrambic Spectator (1931) (essays)
- Doom of Youth (1932) (essays)
- Filibusters in Barbary (1932) (travel; later republished as Journey into Barbary)
- Enemy of the Stars (1932) (play)
- Snooty Baronet (1932) (novel)
- One-Way Song (1933) (poetry)
- Men Without Art (1934) (criticism)
- Left Wings over Europe; or, How to Make a War about Nothing (1936) (essays)
- Blasting and Bombardiering (1937) (autobiography)
- The Revenge for Love (1937) (novel)
- Count Your Dead: They are Alive!: Or, A New War in the Making (1937) (essays)
- The Mysterious Mr. Bull (1938)
- The Jews, Are They Human? (1939) (essay)
- The Hitler Cult and How it Will End (1939) (essay)
- America, I Presume (1940) (travel)
- The Vulgar Streak (1941) (novel)
- Anglosaxony: A League that Works (1941) (essay)
- America and Cosmic Man (1949) (essay)
- Rude Assignment (1950) (autobiography)
- Rotting Hill (1951) (short stories)
- The Writer and the Absolute (1952) (essay)
- Self Condemned (1954) (novel)
- The Demon of Progress in the Arts (1955) (essay)
- Monstre Gai (1955) (novel)
- Malign Fiesta (1955) (novel)
- The Red Priest (1956) (novel)
- The Letters of Wyndham Lewis (1963) (letters)
- The Roaring Queen (1973; written 1936 but unpublished) (novel)
- Unlucky for Pringle (1973) (short stories)
- Mrs Duke's Million (1977; written 1908–10 but unpublished) (novel)
- Creatures of Habit and Creatures of Change (1989) (essays)

== Paintings ==
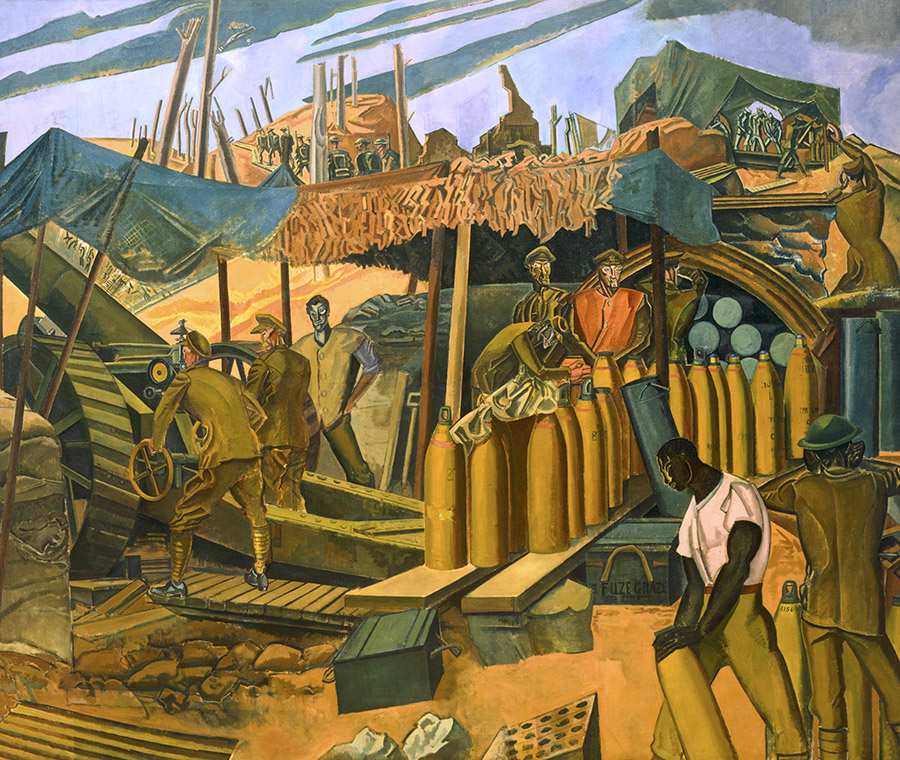
A Canadian Gun-pit, (1919) – National Gallery of Canada

A Battery Shelled (1919) – Imperial War Museum

- The Theatre Manager (1909), watercolour
- The Courtesan (1912), pen and ink, watercolour
- Indian Dance (1912), chalk and watercolour
- Russian Madonna (also known as Russian Scene) (1912), pen and ink, watercolour
- Lovers (1912), pen and ink, watercolour
- Mother and Child (1912), oil on canvas, now lost
- The Dancers (study for Kermesse) (1912), black ink and watercolour, (image)
- Composition (1913), pen and ink, watercolour, (image)
- Plan of War (1913–14), oil on canvas
- Slow Attack (1913–14), oil on canvas
- New York (1914), pen and ink, watercolour
- Argol (1914), pen and ink, watercolour
- The Crowd (1914–15), oil paint and graphite on canvas, (image)
- Workshop (1914–15), oil on canvas, (image)
- Vorticist Composition (1915), gouache and chalk, (image)
- A Canadian Gun-pit (1919), oil on canvas, (image)
- A Battery Shelled (1919), oil on canvas, (image)
- Mr Wyndham Lewis as a Tyro (1920–21), oil on canvas, (image)
- A Reading of Ovid (Tyros) (1920–21), oil on canvas, (image)
- Seated Figure (c. 1921) (image)
- Mrs Schiff (1923–24), oil on canvas, (image)
- Edith Sitwell (1923–1935), oil on canvas, (image)
- Bagdad (1927–28), oil on wood, (image}
- Three Veiled Figures (1933), oil on canvas, (image)
- Creation Myth (1933–1936, oil on canvas, (image)
- Red Scene (1933–1936), oil on canvas, (image)
- One of the Stations of the Dead (1933–1837), oil on canvas, (image}
- The Surrender of Barcelona (1934–1937), oil on canvas, (image)
- Panel for the Safe of a Great Millionaire (1936–37), oil on canvas, (image)
- Newfoundland (1936–37), oil on canvas, (image)
- Pensive Head (1937), oil on canvas, (image)
- Portrait of T. S. Eliot (1938), oil on canvas
- La Suerte (1938), oil on canvas, (image)
- John Macleod (1938), oil on canvas (image)
- Ezra Pound (1939), oil on canvas, (image)
- Mrs R.J. Sainsbury (1940–41), oil on canvas, (image)
- A Canadian War Factory (1943), oil on canvas, (image)
- Nigel Tangye (1946), oil on canvas, (image)
