= Mary Gawthorpe =

English suffragette, trade unionist and editor (1881–1973)

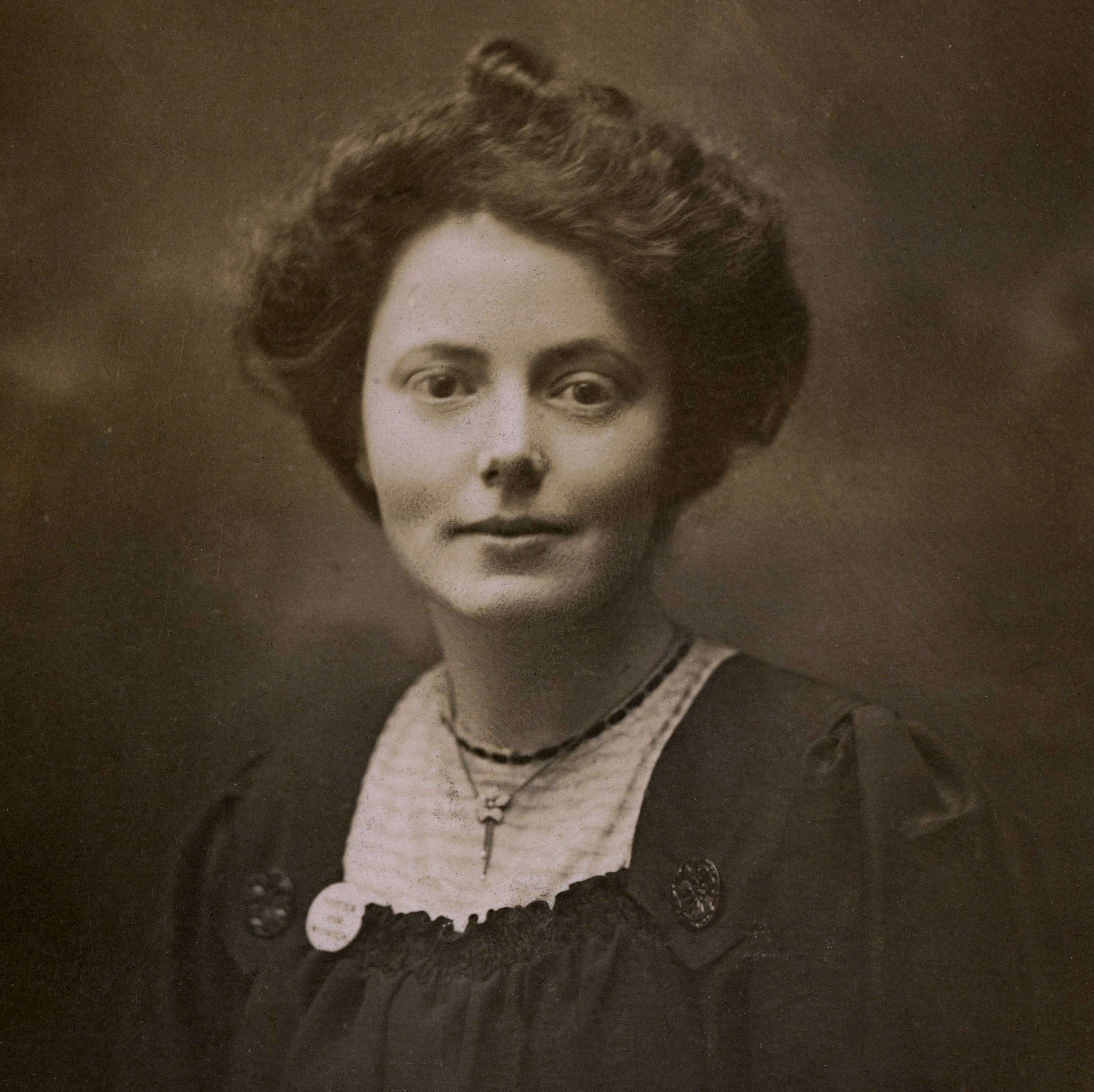
- Born: 12 January 1881; Leeds, England
- Died: 12 March 1973 (aged 92); New York City, United States
- Occupations: Educator, Suffragette

Mary Eleanor Gawthorpe (12 January 1881 – 12 March 1973) was an English suffragette, socialist, trade unionist and editor. She was described by Rebecca West as "a merry militant saint".

== Life ==
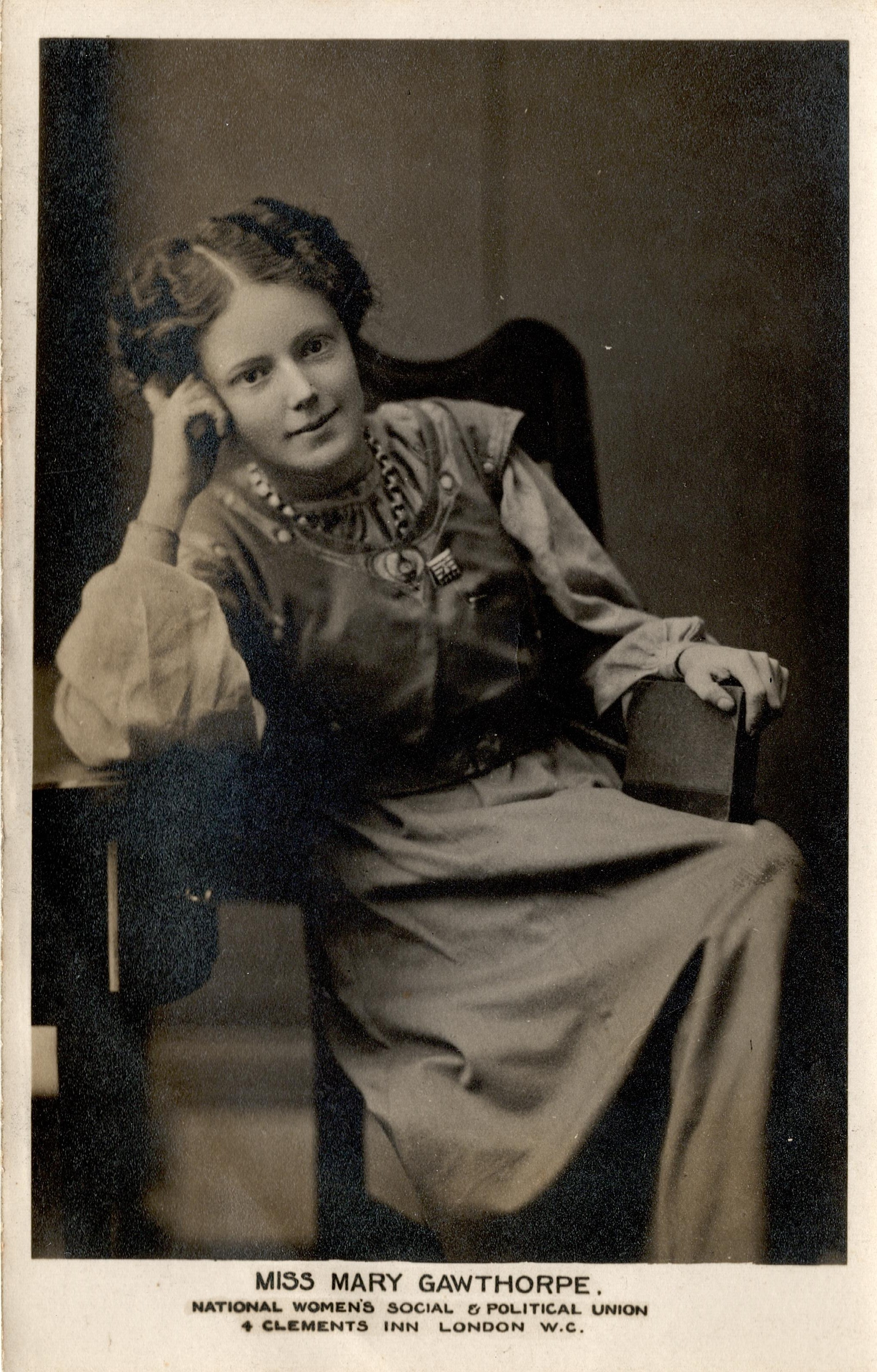
Miss Mary Gawthorpe (ca 1908)

Gawthorpe was born in Woodhouse, Leeds to John Gawthorpe, a leatherworker, and Annie Eliza (Mountain) Gawthorpe. Her mother, Annie, at a very young age worked at a mill until her older sister offered her a position as an assistant. Mary Gawthorpe had four siblings; a baby and eldest sister died within a year of each other due to pneumonia when Mary was seven, and the other two, Annie Gatenby and James Arthur, survived to adulthood.

After qualifying as a teacher in her native Leeds, teaching at Hough Lane School in Bramley, Gawthorpe became a socialist and was active in the local branch of the National Union of Teachers. She joined the Independent Labour Party and in 1906, became secretary of the newly formed Women's Labour League. She became involved in the women's suffrage movement and, in 1905, joined the Women's Social and Political Union. In 1906, she left teaching to become a full-time, paid organiser for the WSPU in Leeds. Sylvia Pankhurst came to Leicester in 1907 and joined Alice Hawkins who made introductions. They were joined by Gawthorpe and they established a WSPU presence in Leicester.

Gawthorpe was an active member of Leeds Arts Club, having been introduced to the club by her journalist boyfriend. She had a close friendship with Alfred Orage who was a fellow primary school teacher in Leeds. In her autobiography, Gawthorpe describes the quiet reading space and group meetings of the club, which shared premises with the Fabian Society and the Theosophic Society. Members often crossed over, and Gawthorpe describes how she came across at the club Annie Besant's writing as well as theosophical ideas on truth and equality. The Club encouraged women to participate in debates, described by Gawthorpe as bringing 'a new art reality into consciousness'.

She later joined Christabel Pankhurst in Wales, where she drew upon her working-class background and involvement in the labour movement. At the meeting in Wales, organised by Samuel Evans, who was standing for reelection to Parliament, Gawthorpe, in perfect Welsh, worried Evans by putting questions to him in his own language at his own meetings. The chairman at the meeting started the Welsh National Anthem, but Gawthorpe turned this to her advantage by leading the singing in her rich voice which "won the hearts of the people still more".

In 1907, Gawthorpe campaigned in the Rutland by-election campaign. She organised an open-air meeting in Uppingham and while standing on a wagon accompanied by several other women, a crowd of "noisy youths began to throw up peppermint 'bull's eyes' and other hard-boiled sweets". Undeterred by the rowdy children, due in part to her time as a schoolteacher, she retorted, "Sweets to the sweet", with a smile on her face and continued her argument until a pot-egg thrown from the crowd hit her on the head and she fell unconscious. She was carried away but returned the next day, like a "true Suffragette", undaunted. Sylvia Pankhurst wrote that the "incident and her plucky spirit, made her the heroine of the Election".

Gawthorpe also campaigned with Jessie Stephenson and Nellie Martel in the 1907 Jarrow by-election. She spoke to different audiences, such as a group of over 200 farmers, on 17 April 1908, in Aberdeen's Exchange Street and at other events in that area, including being heckled at a temperance meeting at Stonehaven, for suffragists supporting barmaids but she declared she was also a temperance reformer.

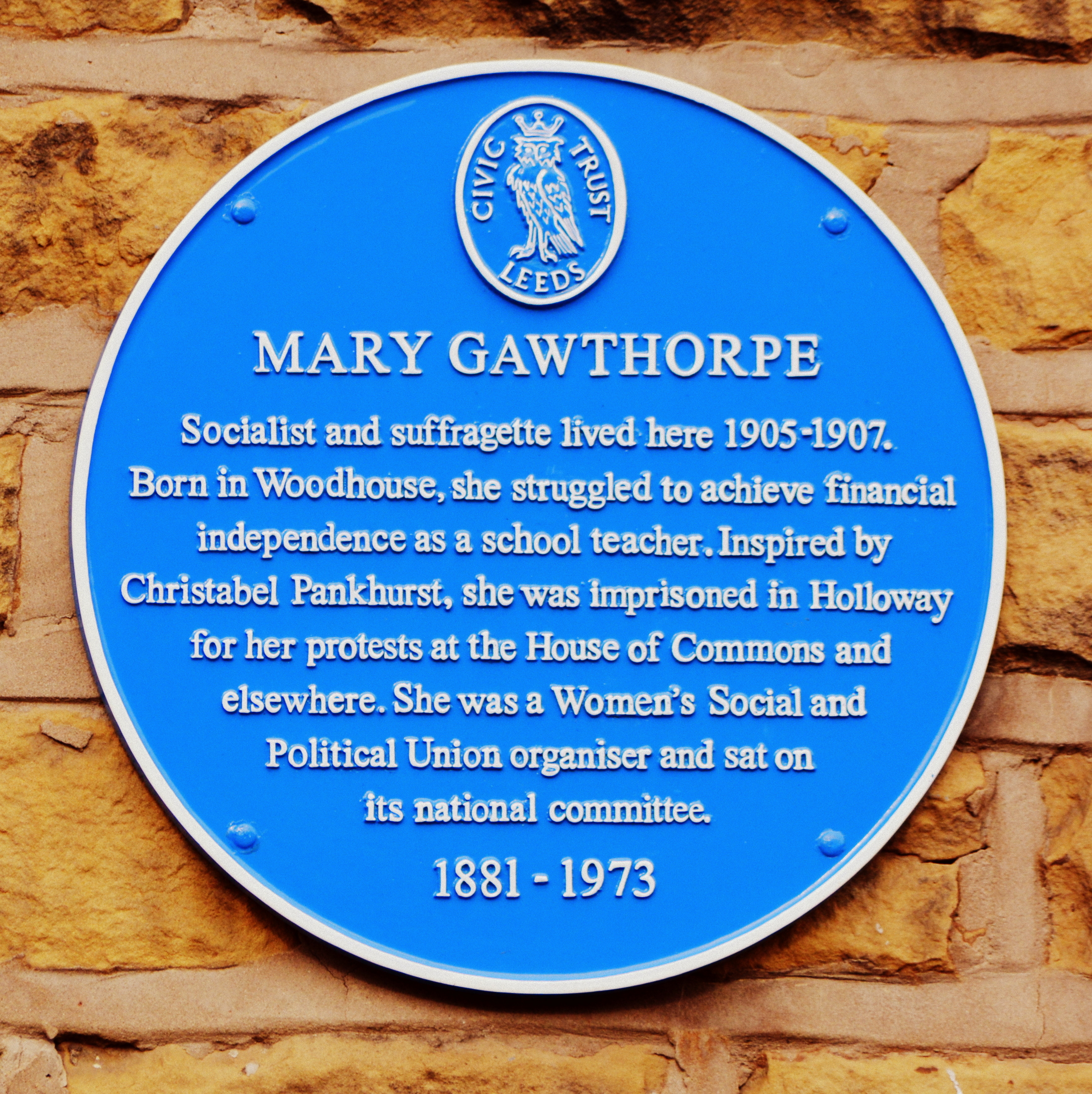
A blue plaque to Gawthorpe in Bramley, Leeds

Gawthorpe spoke at national events, including a rally in Hyde Park in 1908 attended by over 200,000 people. As well as being imprisoned on several occasions for her political activities, Gawthorpe was also badly beaten, suffering serious internal injuries after heckling Winston Churchill in 1909.

In October 1906, she was arrested following a demonstration at the House of Commons because she refused to be bound over to keep the peace and was sentenced to two months' imprisonment. After being released from prison, Gawthorpe was arrested for another House of Commons demonstration in February 1907 and was "badly knocked about and could not appear at court". The case was dismissed the following month.

Several months later, in November 1907, she was arrested, this time with Dora Marsden and Rona Robinson at Manchester University, due to asking Lord Morley about the imprisoned women at Birmingham. The three women were ejected from Lord Morley's meeting and were violently arrested by the police.

In January 1910 on polling day in Southport, Gawthorpe together with fellow suffragettes Dora Marsden and Mabel Capper, were the subject of a violent assault while demonstrating at the polling booths. In February, the three suffragettes brought charges against three men for assault. The charges were dismissed by the magistrates. Outside the court, police intervened in hostilities that arose between supporters of the defendants and those of the three appellants.

In February 1912 Gawthorpe broke a window at the Home Office in protest at the imprisonment and brutal treatment of suffragist William Ball. She demanded to be imprisoned, however the magistrate discharged her on medical grounds.

With Dora Marsden, Gawthorpe was co-editor of the radical periodical The Freewoman: A Weekly Feminist Review, which discussed topics such as women's wage work, housework, motherhood, suffrage movement and literature. Its notoriety and influence rested on its frank discussions on sexuality, morality and marriage, and urged tolerance for male homosexuality. Due to poor health and disagreements with Marsden, Gawthorpe resigned from her duties as co-editor; her final publication was dated 7 March 1912.

Gawthorpe emigrated to New York City in 1916. She was active in the American suffrage movement and later in the trade union movement, becoming an official of the Amalgamated Clothing Workers of America union. She chronicled her early efforts in her autobiography, Up Hill to Holloway (1962).

== Posthumous recognition ==
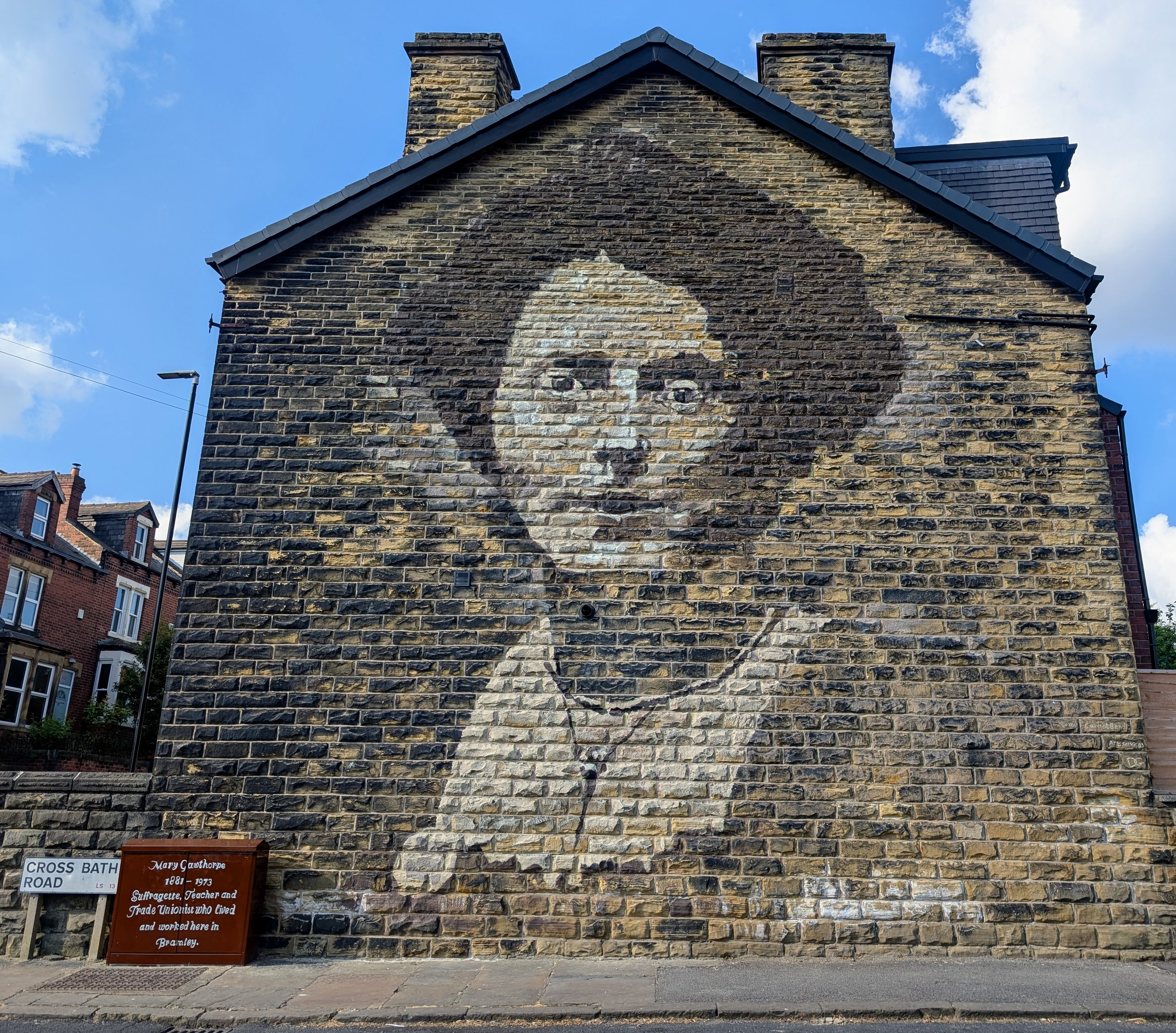
Wall mural of Mary Gawthorpe on a gable end in Bramley, Leeds

Her name and picture (and those of 58 other women's suffrage supporters) are on the plinth of the statue of Millicent Fawcett in Parliament Square, London, unveiled in 2018.

Gawthorpe's name is one of those featured on the sculpture Ribbons, unveiled in Leeds in 2024.

In May 2025, local artist David Griffin painted a large mural of Gawthorpe on a terrace gable end in Bramley.

== See also ==
- List of suffragists and suffragettes
