= Dora Marsden =

English suffragette and editor (1882–1960)

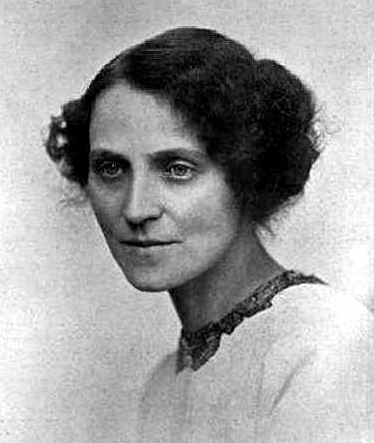
- Marsden in 1912
- Born: Dora Marsden; 5 March 1882; Marsden, Yorkshire, England
- Died: 13 December 1960 (aged 78); Dumfries, Scotland
- Occupations: editor, essayist, suffragist, philosopher, feminist
- Writing career
- Notable works: The Freewoman The New Freewoman; The Egoist
- Movements: women's suffrage, feminism, anarchism, modernism

Dora Marsden (5 March 1882 – 13 December 1960) was an English suffragette, editor of literary journals, and philosopher of language. Beginning her career as an activist in the Women's Social and Political Union (WSPU), Marsden eventually broke off from the suffragist organization in order to found a journal that would provide a space for more radical voices in the movement. Her prime importance lies with her contributions to the suffrage movement, her criticism of the Pankhursts' WSPU, and her radical feminism, via The Freewoman. There are those who also claim she has relevance to the emergence of literary modernism, while others value her contribution to the understanding of egoism.

== Early life ==
Dora Marsden was born on 5 March 1882 to working-class parents, Fred and Hannah, in Marsden, Yorkshire. Economic setbacks in Fred's business forced him to emigrate to the U.S. in 1890, settling in Philadelphia with his eldest son. Hannah worked as a seamstress to support her remaining children, which left the family living in poverty when Marsden was a child.

Among one of the first generations to benefit from the Elementary Education Act 1870 (33 & 34 Vict. c. 75), Marsden was able to attend school as a child despite her impoverished circumstances. She proved a successful student, working as a tutor at the age of thirteen before receiving a Queen's Scholarship at the age of eighteen, which enabled her to attend Owens College in Manchester (later the Victoria University of Manchester). In 1903, Marsden graduated from college and taught school for several years, eventually becoming headmistress of the Altrincham Teacher-Pupil Center in 1908.

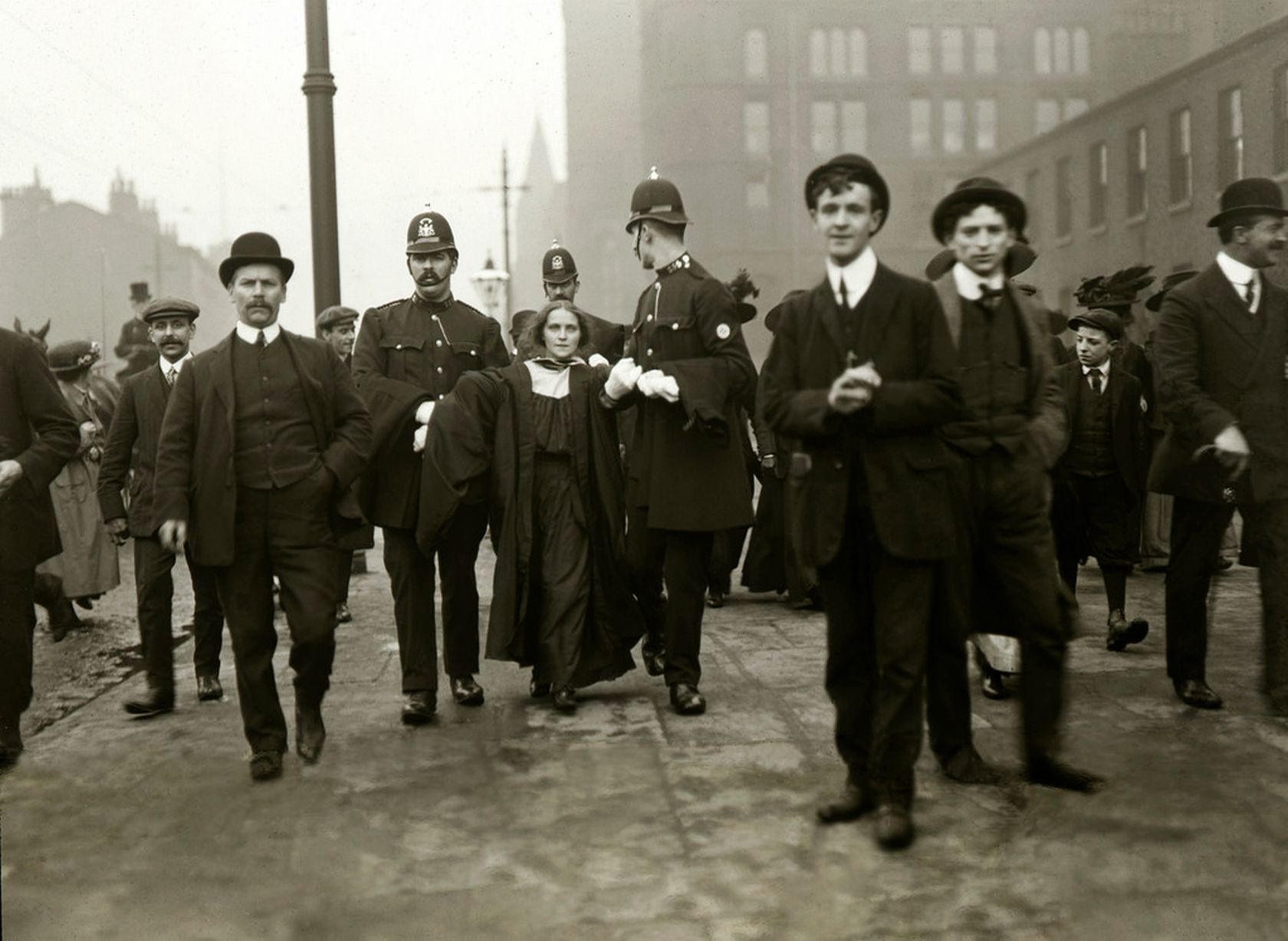
The arrest of Miss Dora Marsden, 30 March 1909

In October 1909, Marsden was arrested with several other members of the Women's Social and Political Union (WSPU) for dressing in full academic regalia and interrupting a speech by the chancellor of their alma mater, demanding that he speak out against the force-feeding of imprisoned suffragist alumni who were on hunger strike. A few months later, she broke into the Southport Empire Theatre and hoisted herself into the cupola, where she waited 15 hours in order to heckle Winston Churchill, who was soon to become Home Secretary, while he was speaking at an election rally. Marsden was arrested with a deputation to Parliament which was widely reported at the time.

Marsden's commitment to the cause earned her an administrative position in Christabel and Emmeline Pankhurst's WSPU, for which she left her teaching position in 1909.

Although she was dedicated to the early feminist movement, Marsden's strong theoretical principles and independent disposition often brought her into conflict with WSPU leadership, who found her unmanageable. In 1911, Marsden mutually agreed with the Pankhursts to resign her position with the WSPU. Disaffected by the organization, but still committed to the women's movement, she was determined to find ways to support alternative voices relevant to the cause.

== Work as editor ==
Marsden was not the only English suffragette to balk at the rigid hierarchy of the WSPU under the Pankhursts, and she decided to begin publishing a journal, The Freewoman, that would showcase a wide range of dissenting voices from the women's movement initially, and eventually from other radical movements as well. This was the first of three successive journals that Marsden would start between 1911 and 1918, with the publication dates of each magazine running as follows: The Freewoman, November 1911 – October 1912; The New Freewoman, June 1913 – December 1913; The Egoist, January 1914 – December 1919. With continuous publication between the second and third, and only a short break between the first and second, critics have had difficulty deciding to what extent the journals should be considered part of the same intellectual project. Consensus seems to rest on the sense that the journals reflect Marsden's shifting political and aesthetic interests, so that the three journals are closely related, but not identical projects, with The New Freewoman closer in spirit to The Egoist than either was to the original journal.

In 1911, Marsden was becoming increasingly interested in egoism and individualist anarchism, an intellectual shift whose development is plainly visible in her editorial columns, where, as the issues progress, the scope of discussion widens to include a wide range of topics pertinent to anarchist theoreticians of the time. Many anarchist thinkers of the time were drawn to emergent avant-garde movements that would later be brought together under the term "modernism".

=== The Freewoman ===
The Freewoman was a short-lived magazine that Marsden founded in order to voice her thoughts and critiques of the WSPU under Pankhurst. She argued that the organization was far too narrowly focused on middle-class women. The journal also explored London's literary background and provided a medium for cultural debate among feminists and other opinionated groups. This journal was famous for its overtly feminist advertisements that were scattered throughout the pages. At the beginning of publications it had advertisements that were for businesses such as patent agencies that were geared towards "Women Patentees", a bank that took care of the "Going Stock Business", and the International Suffrage Shop.

The magazine dealt with controversial issues such as marriage and free love, with Marsden and other authors writing in support of the latter. Marsden held that monogamy had four cornerstones: men's hypocrisy; the spinster's dumb resignation; the prostitute's unsightly degradation; and the married woman's monopoly. Writers such as Rebecca West wrote that by giving her body to a man to be owned by him for the rest of their life, while binding the man to support her for the rest of her life, a woman strikes a disgraceful 'bargain'.

This magazine also issued a five-part series on morality written by Marsden. She explored the idea that women had been taught to restrain their passions for life, resulting in an existence only used for reproduction. This brought her back to her critique of the suffrage movement, and their image of purity and the middle-class woman. After its financial collapse, it soon emerged into The New Freewoman.

=== The New Freewoman ===
The New Freewoman shifted the view of The Freewoman, which was a radical feminist view, to an idealistic anarchism and literary experimentalism. The bold advertisements were changed to text-only ads, and the magazine took on a much different approach. This developed into Marsden's view on egoism as a philosophy, which was heavily influenced by Ezra Pound.

These two journals became heavily influenced by Rebecca West and Mary Gawthorpe. The two women set out to increase the audience of The New Freewoman, by increasing their literary content. This would result in more writers expressing interest in the journal, and resulting in more readers. Although The New Freewoman did not last very long itself, it progressed into a very popular journal The Egoist.

== Marsden's philosophical legacy ==
Marsden's magnum opus, produced later in her life, was not well received (not even by her former supporters) and she suffered a psychological breakdown in 1930, which was further deepened by the death of her mother in 1935. It is said that her moods fluctuated between very optimistic or pessimistic views of her work and that she developed delusional beliefs. In 1935 Marsden was admitted to the Crichton Royal Hospital located in Dumfries where she lived for the rest of her life. The hospital classified her as severely depressed. Marsden died of a heart attack on 13 December 1960. A full-length biography by Les Garner - Dora Marsden: a Brave and Beautiful Spirit - was published by 127 House in 2019.

== See also ==
- History of feminism
- List of suffragists and suffragettes
- Women's suffrage in the United Kingdom
