= The New Freewoman =

The New Freewoman was a monthly London literary magazine edited by Dora Marsden and owned by Harriet Shaw Weaver. Initially, Rebecca West was in charge of the literary content of the magazine, but after meeting Ezra Pound at one of Violet Hunt's parties in 1913 she recommended that he be appointed literary editor. The magazine existed between June 1913 and December 1913.
