= 1914 in art =

Events from the year 1914 in art.

== Events ==
- January 31 – The Art Gallery of Hamilton is founded in Ontario.
- March – The London Group hold their first exhibition, at the Goupil Gallery.
- March–June – Rebel Art Centre run in London by Wyndham Lewis and others.
- March 10 – Suffragette Mary Richardson damages the Velázquez painting Rokeby Venus (c. 1651) in the National Gallery, London, with a meat cleaver.
- April
  - Umberto Boccioni publishes Manifesto tecnico della scultura futurista ("Technical manifesto of futurist sculpture"); later this year he also publishes the book Pittura e scultura futuriste (dinamismo plastico) ("Futurist painting and sculpture").
  - August Macke, Louis Moilliet and Paul Klee travel in Tunisia.
- April 20 – English artist Dorothy Shakespear marries American poet Ezra Pound at St Mary Abbots church, Kensington, London.
- May 4 – Suffragette Mary Wood attacks John Singer Sargent's portrait of Henry James at the Royal Academy Summer Exhibition of 1914 in London with a meat cleaver. At the same exhibition on May 12, Gertrude Mary Ansell attacks the recently deceased Hubert von Herkomer's portrait of the Duke of Wellington, and on May 26 'Mary Spencer' (Maude Kate Smith) attacks George Clausen's painting Primavera.
- June – First issue (of two) published of the Vorticist literary magazine BLAST edited by Wyndham Lewis.
- July – David Bomberg's first solo exhibition of paintings opens at the Chenil Gallery in Chelsea, London; his The Mud Bath is hung outside.
- July 17 – Suffragette Annie Hunt damages Sir John Millais' portrait of Thomas Carlyle (1877) in the National Portrait Gallery, London, with a meat cleaver.
- August – Fernand Léger is mobilised for service in the French Army; he serves in the Forest of Argonne.
- September 5 – The cover of magazine London Opinion first carries the iconic drawing by Alfred Leete of Lord Kitchener with the recruiting slogan Your Country Needs You.
- October 11 – English painter John Currie dies having shot himself and his mistress and model, Dorothy ("Dolly") Eileen Henry, in Chelsea, London.
- November 16 – The Baltimore Museum of Art is founded at Johns Hopkins University in the United States.
- The Bilbao Fine Arts Museum (Museo de Bellas Artes) is established in Bilbao.
- Futurist exhibition at the Doré Gallery in London.
- Edward Perry Warren's copy of Rodin's sculpture The Kiss is loaned for public display in the English town of Lewes, but objections to its erotic nature cause it to covered over and screened off.
- Clive Bell publishes his formalist study Art.
- Publication of Vincent van Gogh's letters to his brother Theo.
- Nina Hamnett and Amedeo Modigliani meet for the first time, at La Rotonde in Montparnasse, Paris.
- Daniel Chester French is commissioned by the Lincoln Memorial committee to create a statue of Abraham Lincoln for the Lincoln Memorial in Washington, D.C., unveiled in 1922.

== Works ==
Giorgio de Chirico, Love Song, 1914, MOMA, New York

=== Paintings ===
- Umberto Boccioni
  - Il bevitore ("The Drinker")
  - I selciatori ("The Street Pavers")
  - Dinamismo plastico: cavallo + caseggiato ("Plastic Dynamism: Horse + Houses"; approx. date)
- Pierre Bodard – Lili Boulanger
- David Bomberg – The Mud Bath
- Antoine Bourdelle – Dying Centaur
- John Collier
  - Angela McInnes
  - Clytemnestra (Worcester City Art Gallery & Museum)
- Eugene de Blaas – In the Water
- Giorgio de Chirico
  - Gare Montparnasse (The Melancholy of Departure)
  - The Mystery and Melancholy of a Street
  - La Nostalgie du poete
  - The Song of Love (Museum of Modern Art, New York)
- Stanisława de Karłowska – Swiss Cottage
- Philip de László - Portrait of Lord Arthur Balfour
- André Derain - Portrait of a Man with a Newspaper
- Carl Eytel - Desert near Palm Springs
- Pavel Filonov – Holy Family
- Mark Gertler – The Creation of Eve
- Albert Gleizes – Woman with animals (Madame Raymond Duchamp-Villon)
- J. W. Godward
  - The Necklace
  - The New Perfume
  - Tranquility
- Marsden Hartley – Portrait of a German Officer
- Alexandre Jacovleff – Self-portrait as Harlequin and Pierrot
- Ernst Ludwig Kirchner – Potsdamer Platz
- Paul Klee – In the Style of Kairouan
- Oskar Kokoschka – The Bride of the Wind
- Fernand Léger – Nature morte (Still life)
- August Macke
  - Farewell
  - Kairouan (III) (watercolor)
  - View into a Lane
- Franz Marc
  - Animals in a Landscape
  - Fighting Form
  - Landscape with house, dog and cattle
  - Rehe im Walde (II)
- Henri Matisse – Woman on a High Stool
- Alfred Munnings – Setting off: Huntsman and Hounds
- William Nicholson – Le retour de la Joconde ("The return of the Giaconda")
- Pablo Picasso - Guitar (sheet metal scultpture)
- Walter Sickert
  - Ennui (probable date of Tate Britain version)
  - The Integrity of Belgium
  - Soldiers of King Albert at the Ready
  - Tipperary
- Xul Solar – Entierro ("The Burial")
- Stanley Spencer – Self-portrait

=== Sculptures ===
- Ernst Barlach – Der Rächer (The Avenger)
- John H. Beaver – Fountain for Company H (Portland, Oregon)
- Edward Berge – Armistead Monument (Baltimore)
- Carrère and Hastings and Edward Clark Potter – Sidney Lanier Monument (Atlanta)
- Marcel Duchamp – Bottle Rack (readymade; original version)
- Jacob Epstein – The Rock Drill (final form; Tate Britain)
- Daniel Chester French – The Spirit of Life (Saratoga Springs, New York)
- Henri Gaudier-Brzeska – Hieratic Head of Ezra Pound
- Mario Korbel – Illinois Monument
- Evelyn Beatrice Longman – Spirit of Communication
- Adolfo Wildt – Vir Temporis Acti (Ancient Man)

=== Interior design ===
- Omega Workshops – Cadena Café, 59 Westbourne Grove, London

== Births ==
=== January to June ===
- January 5
  - Nicolas de Staël, Russian-born painter (died 1955)
  - Tadeusz Trepkowski, Polish poster artist (died 1954)
- January 7 – Edwin La Dell, British artist (died 1970)
- January 10 – John Petts, English-born Welsh engraver (died 1991)
- January 26 – Walter Stuempfig, American painter (died 1970)
- February 3 – Felix Kelly, New Zealand-born artist (died 1994)
- February 11 – Mervyn Levy, British art critic (died 1996)
- February 21 – Park Su-geun, Korean painter (died 1965)
- February 22 – Karl Otto Götz, German painter (died 2017)
- March 3 – Asger Jorn, Danish artist and essayist (died 1973)
- March 4 – Ward Kimball, American Academy Award-winning animator (died 2002)
- March 9 – Piet Esser, Dutch sculptor (died 2004)
- March 14 – Abdias do Nascimento, Brazilian actor, artist and politician (died 2011)
- April 13 – John Russell Harper, Canadian art historian (died 1983)
- May 18 – Pierre Balmain, French fashion designer (died 1982)
- May 21 – Oton Gliha, Croatian painter (died 1999)
- May 29 – Charles Mozley, British illustrator and designer (died 1991)
- June 15 – Saul Steinberg, Romanian-born American cartoonist and illustrator (died 1999)
- June 29 – Franz Joseph, American artist and writer (died 1994)

=== July to December ===
- July 5 – Jean Tabaud, French artist (died 1996)
- July 7 – Erni Cabat, American artist (died 1994)
- July 23 – Virgil Finlay, American artist (died 1971)
- July 27 – Emerson Woelffer, American painter (died 2003)
- July 29 – Abram Games, English poster artist (died 1996)
- August 15 – Paul Rand, American graphic designer (died 1996)
- August 20 – Yann Goulet, French sculptor, Breton nationalist and war-time collaborationist with Nazi Germany (died 1999)
- September 6 – Bogdan Šuput, Serbian painter (died 1942)
- September 18 – Jack Cardiff, English photographer and cinematographer (died 2009)
- September 23 – Annely Juda, born Anneliese Brauer, German-born art dealer (died 2006)
- September 30 – Tom Eckersley, English poster artist (died 1997)
- October 7 – Duilio Barnabè, Italian painter (died 1961)
- October 8 – Henry C. Pearson, American abstract and modernist painter (died 2006)
- October 17 – Jerry Siegel, American comic book artist (died 1996)
- October 30 – Max Angus, Australian painter (died 2017)
- November 5 – Alton Tobey, American painter, historical artist, muralist, portraitist, illustrator and teacher (died 2005)
- November 28 – Blanch Ackers, American folk artist and painter (died 2003)
- December 12 – Frank Roper, English metal sculptor and stained glass artist (died 2000)
- December 16
  - Norman Blamey, British painter (died 2000)
  - O. Winston Link, American photographer (died 2001)
- December 21 – Ivan Generalić, Croatian naïve art painter (died 1992)
- December 22 – Karin Jonzen, British sculptor (died 1998)

=== Unknown ===
- Hafidh al-Droubi, Iraqi painter (died 1991)

== Deaths ==
- January 12 – Vinnie Ream, sculptor (born 1847)
- January 15 – Peter Adolf Persson, Swedish painter (born 1862)
- January 21 – Salvador Martínez Cubells, Spanish painter and art restorer (born 1845)
- January 26 – Jane Burden, artists' model closely associated with the Pre-Raphaelites (born 1839)
- February 8 – Josefa Texidor Torres, Spanish painter (born 1875)
- February 9 – Bart van Hove, Dutch sculptor (born 1850)
- February 25 – Sir John Tenniel, illustrator associated with Lewis Carroll (born 1820)
- March 25 – Spencer Gore, painter (born 1878)
- April 6 – Józef Marian Chełmoński, Polish painter (born 1849)
- April 14 – Antonio Frixione, Italian painter and printmaker (born 1843)
- May 5 – Johannes Pfuhl, German sculptor (born 1846)
- May 18 – Charles Sprague Pearce, painter (born 1851)
- June 1 – Árpád Feszty, Hungarian painter (born 1856)
- June 12 – Béla Spányi, Hungarian painter (born 1852)
- June 13 – Odoardo Toscani, Italian painter (born 1859)
- June 26 – Antonio Herrera Toro, Venezuelan painter, critic and professor (born 1857)
- July 22 – Charles Maurin, French painter and engraver (born 1856)
- August 22 – James Dickson Innes, landscape painter (born 1887; tuberculosis)
- September 26 – August Macke, German painter (born 1887; killed in action)
- September 27 – Carlos María Herrera, Uruguayan portrait painter (born 1875)
- October 29 – Félix Bracquemond, painter and etcher (born 1833)
- date unknown – Franz Alt, Austrian landscape painter (born 1821)
- probable – Faustin Betbeder, caricaturist (born 1847)
