= Blamey =

Blamey may refer to:

- Blamey Barracks, Australian Army Recruit Training Centre at Kapooka, Wagga Wagga, in the Riverina region of New South Wales
- Blamey Stakes, Group 2 Australian thoroughbred horse race open run at Flemington Racecourse in March each year
- Marjorie Blamey OBE (born 1919), English painter and illustrator, noted for her botanical illustrations
- Norman Blamey (1914–2000), English painter, noted latterly for his portraits
- Thomas Blamey, GBE, KCB, CMG, DSO, ED (1884–1951), Australian General of the First and Second World Wars

== See also ==
- Blame
