= American modernism =

American philosophical movement

American modernism, much like the modernism movement in general, is a trend of philosophical thought arising from the widespread changes in culture and society in the age of modernity. American modernism is an artistic and cultural movement in the United States beginning at the turn of the 20th century, with a core period between World War I and World War II. Like its European counterpart, American modernism stemmed from a rejection of Enlightenment thinking, seeking to better represent reality in a new, more industrialized world.

== History ==
Characteristically, modernist art has a tendency to abstraction, is innovative, aesthetic, futuristic and self-referential. It includes visual art, literature, music, film, design, architecture as well as life style. It reacts against historicism, artistic conventions and institutionalization of art. Art was not only to be dealt with in academies, theaters or concert halls, but to be included in everyday life and accessible for everybody. Furthermore, cultural institutions concentrated on fine art and scholars paid little attention to the revolutionary styles of modernism. Economic and technological progress in the U.S. during the Roaring Twenties gave rise to widespread utopianism, which influenced some modernist artists, while others were skeptical of the embrace of technology. The victory in World War I confirmed the status of the U.S. as an international player and gave the people self-confidence and a feeling of security. In this context, American modernism marked the beginning of American art as distinct and autonomous from European taste, by breaking artistic conventions that had been shaped after European traditions until then.

American modernism benefited from the diversity of immigrant cultures. Artists were inspired by African, Caribbean, Asian and European folk cultures and embedded these exotic styles in their works.

The Modernist American movement was a reflection of American life in the 20th century. In the quickly industrializing world and hastened pace of life, it was easy for the individual to be swallowed up by the vastness of things, left wandering, devoid of purpose. Social boundaries in race, class, sex, wealth and religion were being challenged. As the social structure was challenged by new incoming views, the bounds of traditional standards and social structure dissolved, and a loss of identity was what remained, translating eventually into isolation, alienation and an overall feeling of separateness from any kind of "whole". The unity of a war-rallied country was dying, along with it the illusion of the pleasantries it sold to its soldiers and people. The world was left violent, vulgar and spiritually empty.

The middle class worker fell into a distinctly unnoticeable position, a cog much too small to hope to find recognition in a much greater machine. Citizens were overcome with their own futility. Youths' dreams shattered with failure and a disillusioning disappointment in recognition of limit and loss. The lives of the disillusioned and outcasts became more focal. Ability to define self through hard work and resourcefulness, to create your own vision of yourself without the help of traditional means, became prized. Some authors endorsed this, while others, such as F. Scott Fitzgerald, challenged how alluring but destructively false the values of privilege can be.

Modernist America had to find common ground in a world no longer unified in belief. The unity found lay in the common ground of the shared consciousness within all human experience. The importance of the individual was emphasized; the truly limited nature of the human experience formed a bond across all bridges of race, class, sex, wealth or religion. Society, in this way, found shared meaning, even in disarray.

Some see modernism in the tradition of 19th century aestheticism and the "art for art's sake" movement. Clement Greenberg argues that modernist art excludes "anything outside itself". Others see modernist art, for example in blues and jazz music, as a medium for emotions and moods, and many works dealt with contemporary issues, like feminism and city life. Some artists and theoreticians even added a political dimension to American modernism.

American modernist design and architecture enabled people to lead a modern life. Work and family life changed radically and rapidly due to the economic upswing during the 1920s. In the U.S., the car became popular and affordable for many, leisure time and entertainment gained importance and the job market opened up for women. In order to make life more efficient, designers and architects aimed at the simplification of housework.

The Great Depression at the end of the '20s and during the '30s disillusioned people about the economic stability of the country and eroded utopianist thinking. The outbreak and the terrors of World War II caused further changes in mentality. The Post-war period that followed was termed Late Modernism. The Postmodernist era was generally considered characteristic of the art of the late 20th century beginning in the 1980s.

== Visual arts ==
=== American modernist painting ===
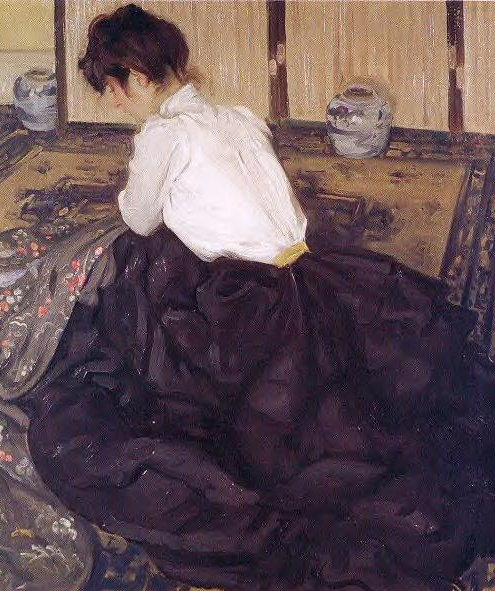
Alfred Henry Maurer, An Arrangement, 1901

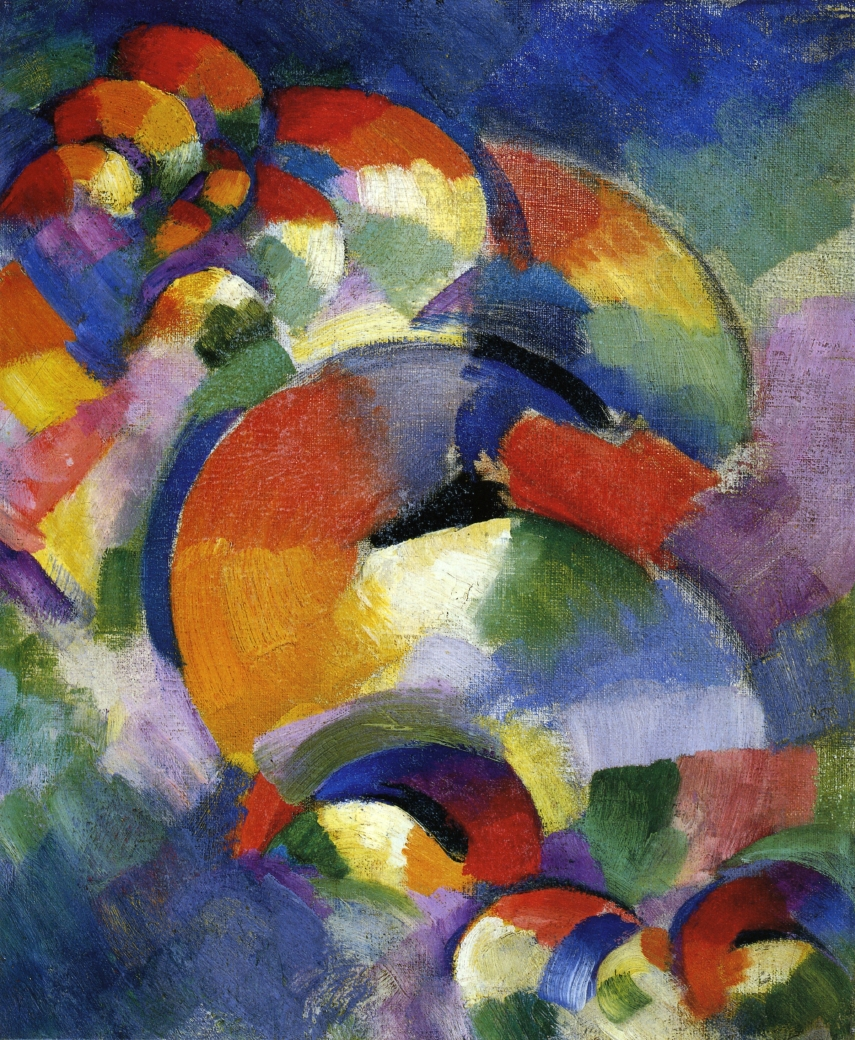
Morgan Russell, Cosmic Synchromy, 1913-1914 Synchromism

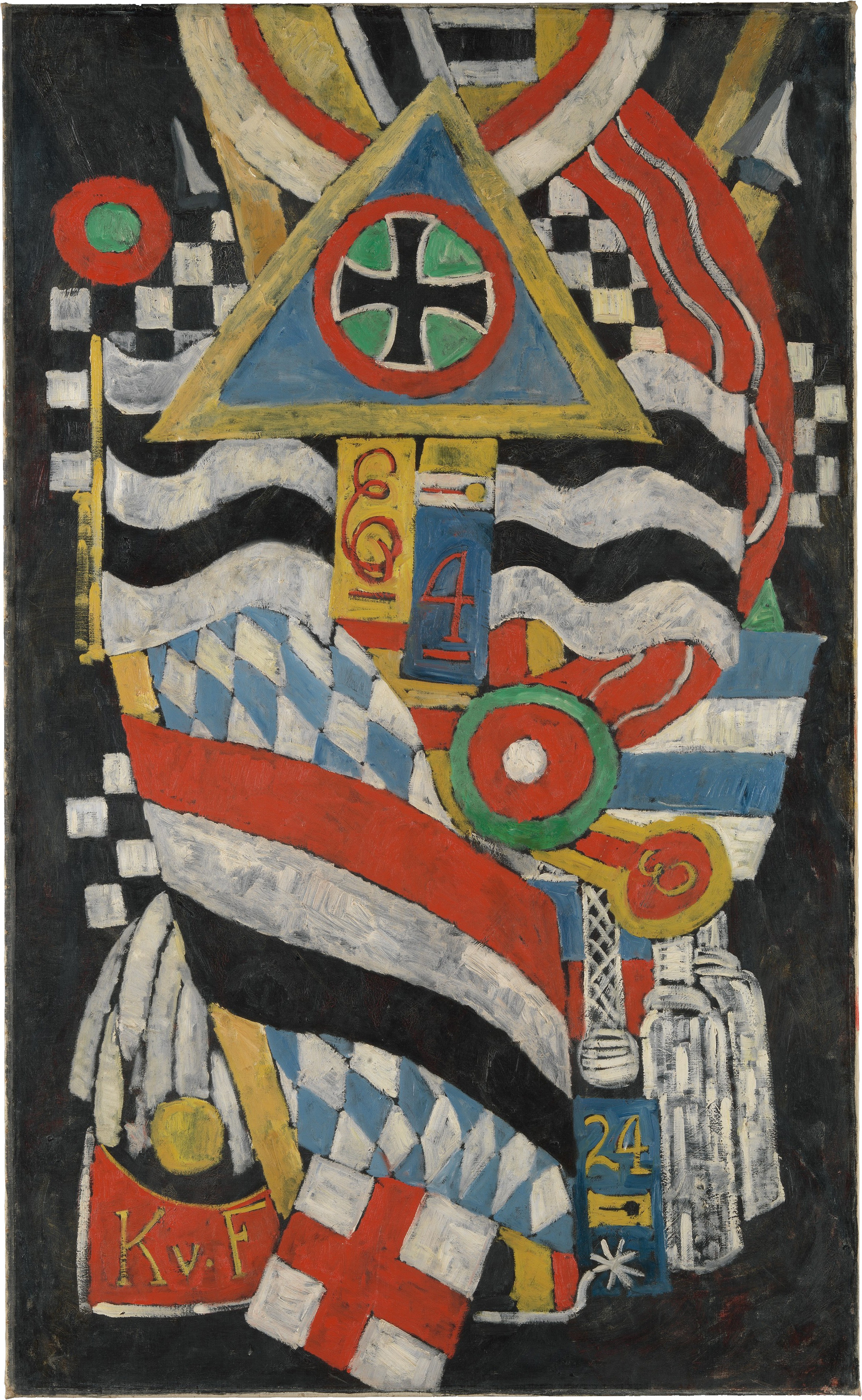
Marsden Hartley, Portrait of a German Officer, 1914

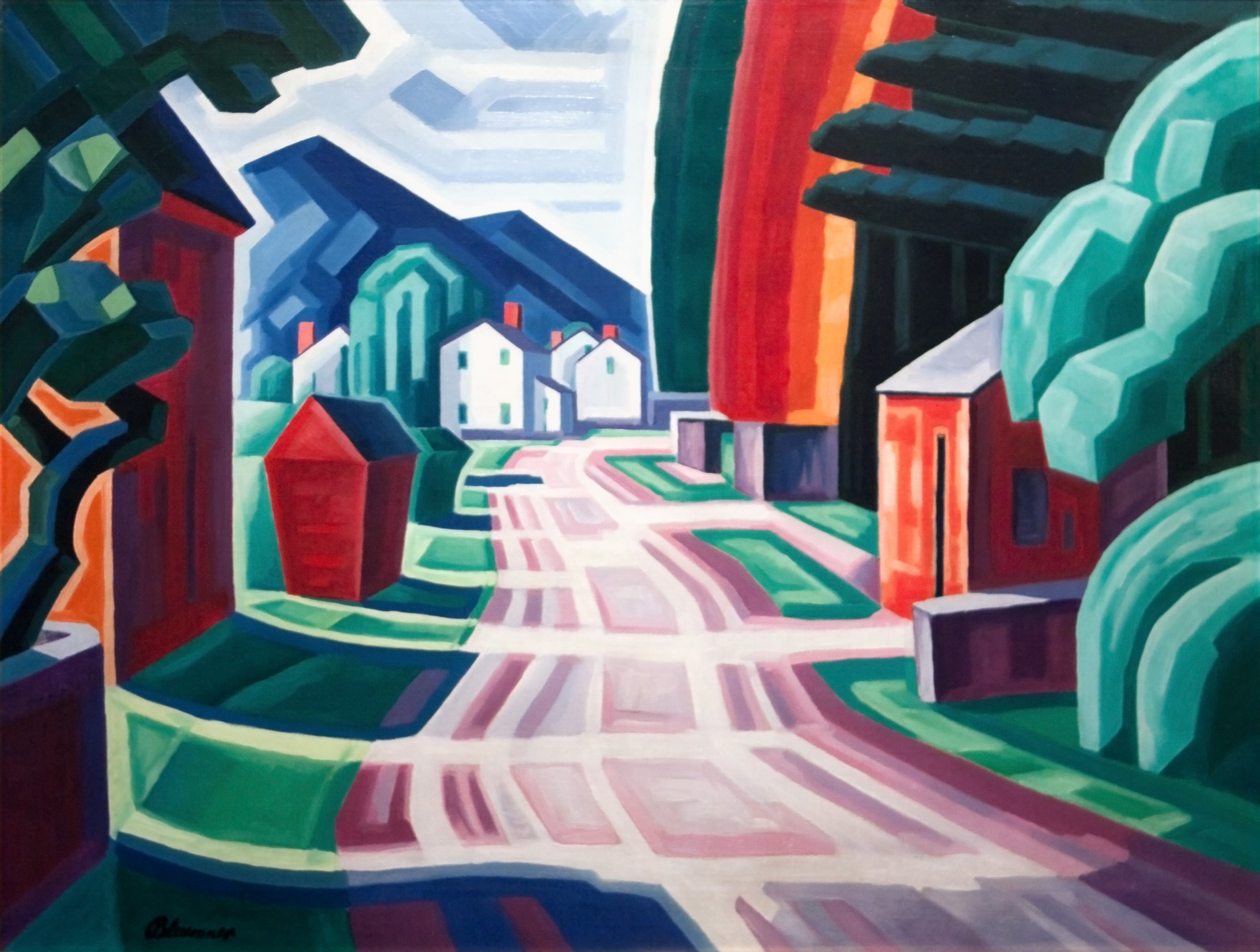
Oscar Bluemner, Form and Light, Motif in West New Jersey, 1914

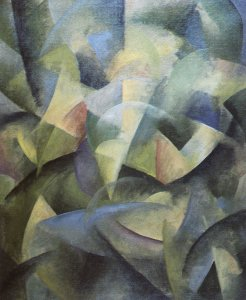
Andrew Dasburg, Improvisation, circa 1915-1916

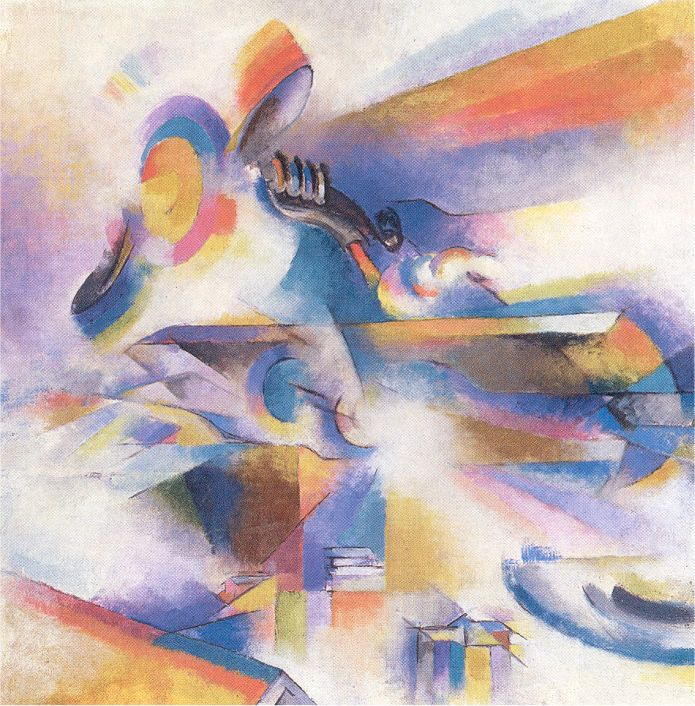
Stanton Macdonald-Wright, Airplane Synchromy in Yellow-Orange, 1920 Synchromism

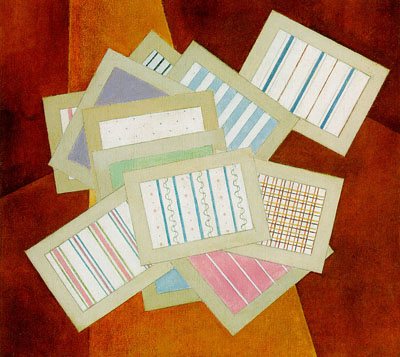
Charles Demuth, Spring, 1921

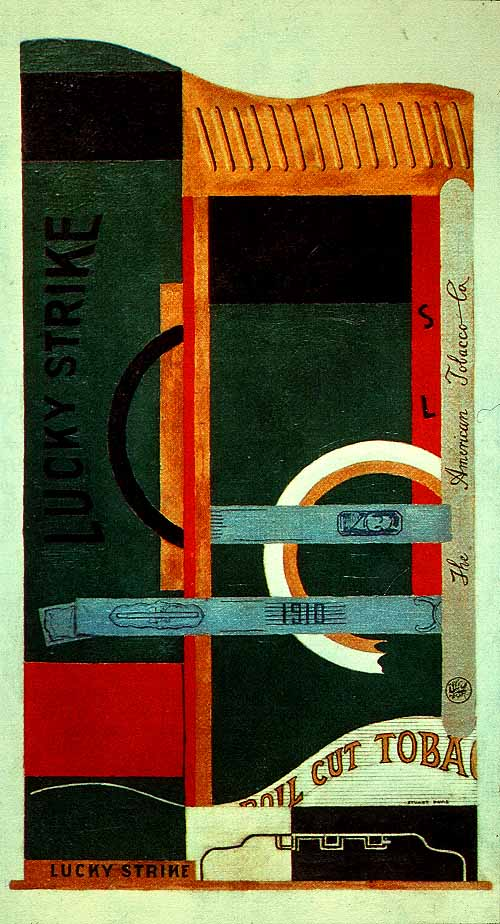
Stuart Davis, Lucky Strike, 1921

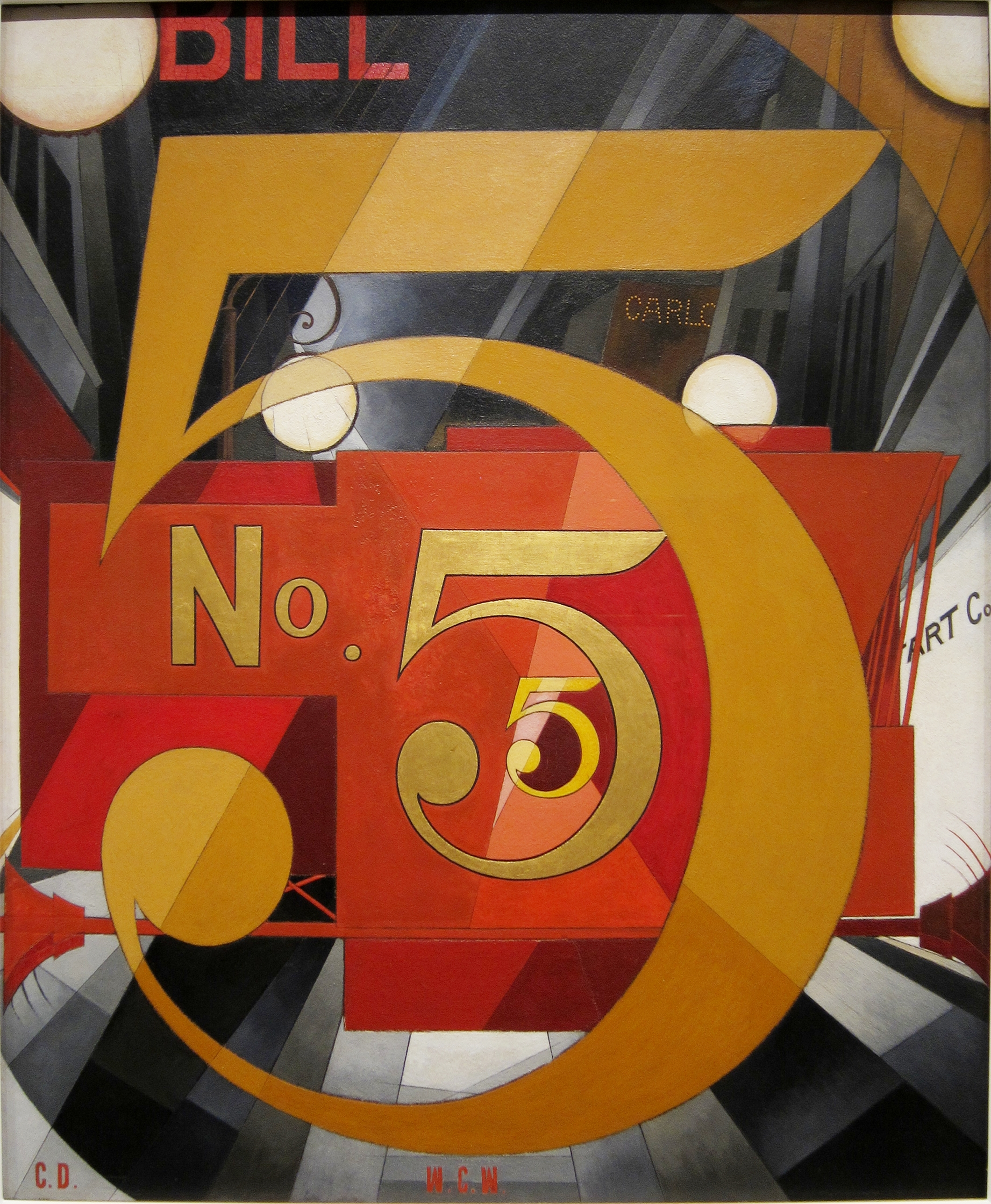
Charles Demuth, Figure 5 in Gold, 1928

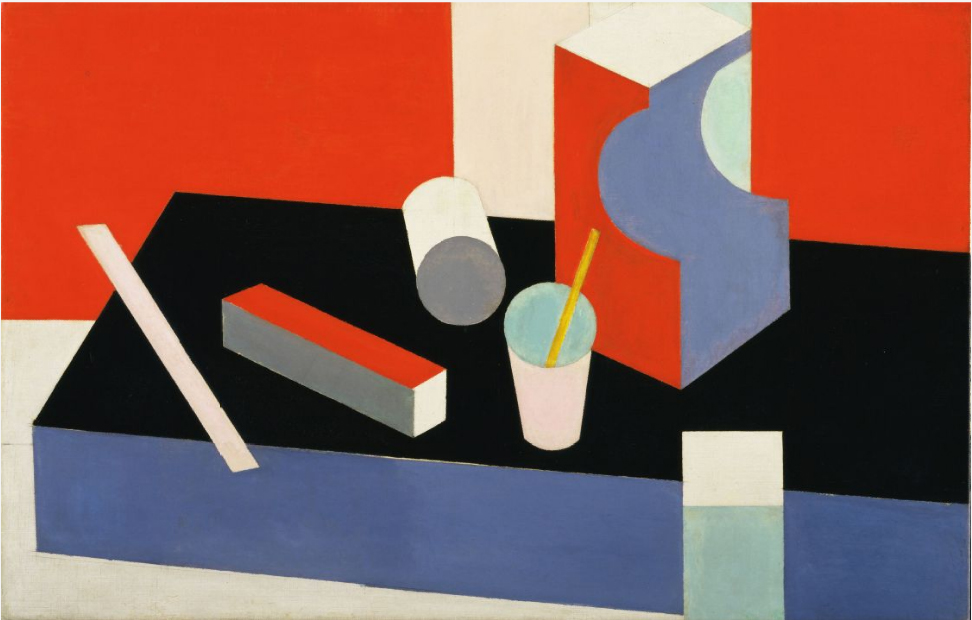
Patrick Henry Bruce, Painting, circa 1929-1930

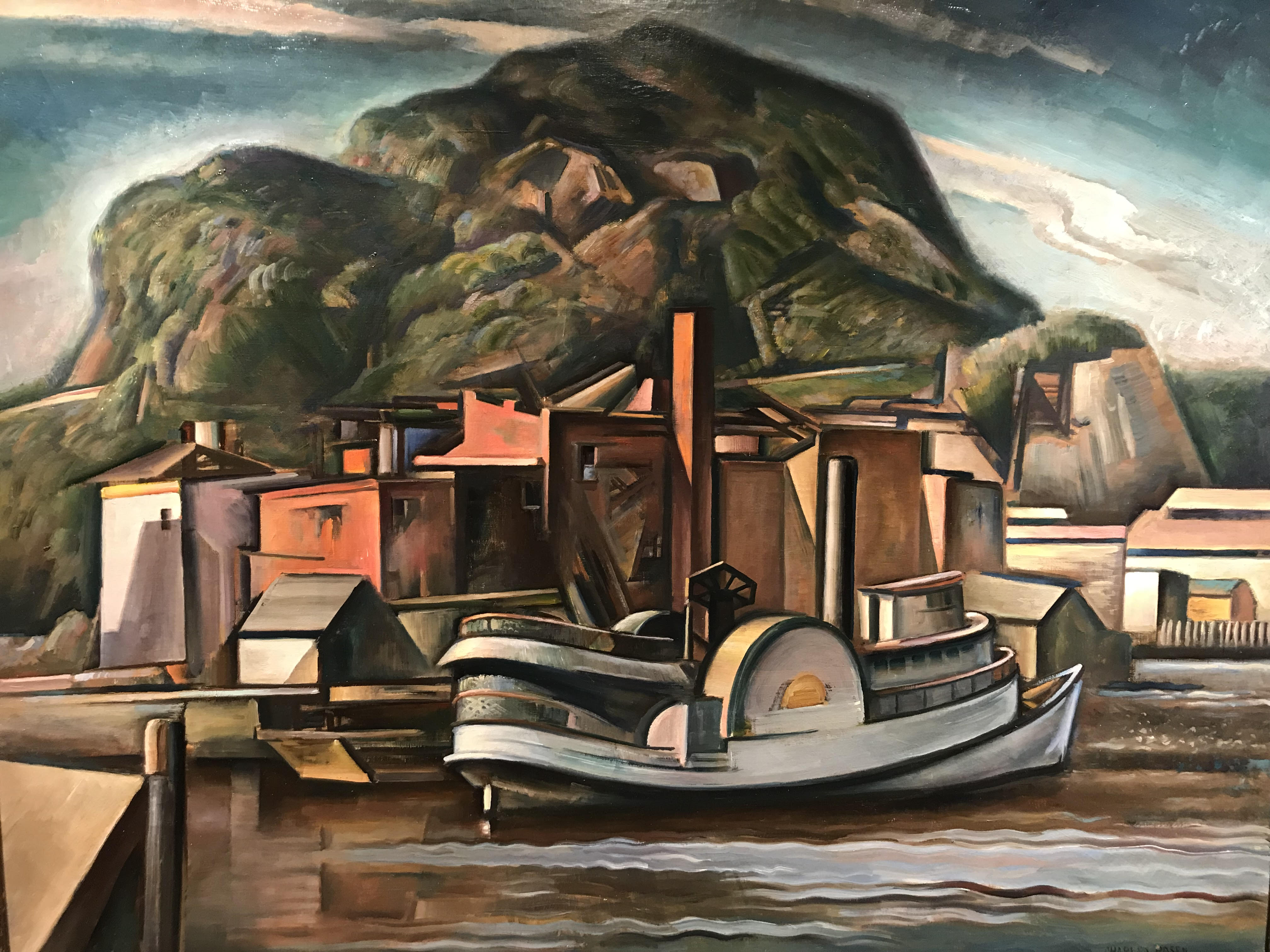
Charles Rosen, Sidewheel in the Rondout, 1920's Precisionism

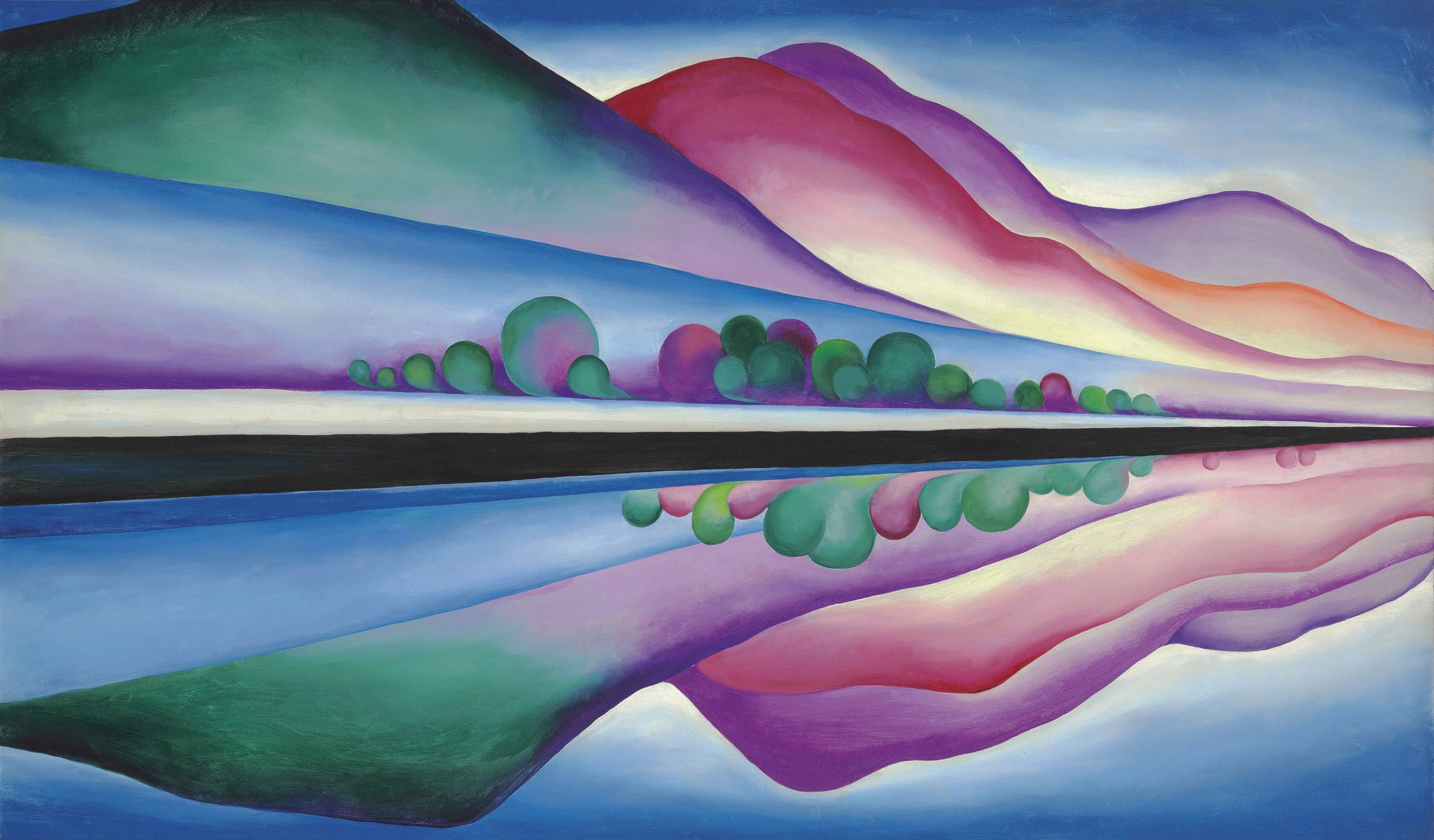
Georgia O'Keeffe, Lake George Reflection, circa 1921-1922

There is no single date for the beginning of the modern era in America, as dozens of painters were active at the beginning of the 20th century. It was the time when the first cubist landscapes (Precisionism), still-life and portraits appeared; bright colors entered the palettes of painters, and the first non-objective paintings were displayed in the galleries.

The modernist movement during the formative years was also becoming popular in New York City by 1913 at the popular Manhattan studio gallery of Wilhelmina Weber Furlong (1878–1962) and through the work of the Whitney Studio Club in 1918. According to Davidson, the beginning of American modernist painting can be dated to the 1910s. The early part of the period lasted 25 years and ended around 1935, when modern art was referred to as, what Greenberg called the avant-garde.

The 1913 Armory Show in New York City displayed the contemporary work of European artists, as well as Americans. The Impressionist, Fauvist and Cubist paintings startled many American viewers who were accustomed to more conventional art. However, inspired by what they saw, many American artists were influenced by the radical and new ideas.

The early 20th century was marked by the exploration of different techniques and ways of artistic expressiveness. Many American artists like Wilhelmina Weber, Man Ray, Patrick Henry Bruce, Gerald Murphy and others went to Europe, notably Paris, to make art. The formation of various artistic assemblies led to the multiplicity of meaning in the visual arts. The Ashcan School gathered around realism (Robert Henri or George Luks); the Stieglitz circle glorified abstract visions of New York City (Max Weber, Abraham Walkowitz); color painters evolved in direction of the colorful, abstract "synchromies" (Stanton Macdonald-Wright and Morgan Russell), whereas precisionism visualized the industrialized landscape of America in the form of sharp and dynamic geometrization (Joseph Stella, Charles Sheeler, Morton Livingston Schamberg, Charles Rosen, and Charles Demuth). Eventually artists like Charles Burchfield, Marsden Hartley, Stuart Davis, Arthur Dove, Georgia O'Keeffe who was thought of as the mother of American Modernism, John Marin, Arthur Beecher Carles, Alfred Henry Maurer, Andrew Dasburg, James Daugherty, John Covert, Henrietta Shore, William Zorach, Marguerite Thompson (Zorach), Manierre Dawson, Arnold Friedman and Oscar Bluemner ushered in the era of Modernism to the New York School.

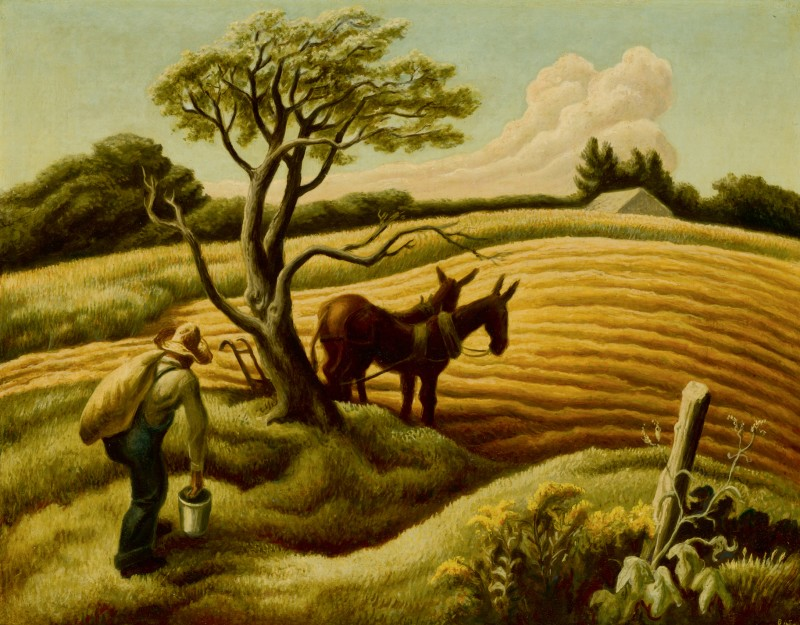
Noon 1939 American Regionalism by Thomas Hart Benton

The shift of focus and multiplicity of subjects in the visual arts is also a hallmark of American modernist art. Thus, for example, the group The Eight brought the focus on the modern city, and placed emphasis on the diversity of different classes of citizens. But the late 1920s and the 1930s belonged to two movements in American painting, Regionalism and Social Realism. American Regionalism became prominent during the Great Depression and the artists opposed "international urban modernism" as promoted in New York by Alfred Stieglitz.

American Modernism artists like Charles Demuth, who created his masterpiece I Saw The Figure Five in Gold in 1928, Morton Schamberg and Charles Sheeler were closely related to the Precisionist movement. Sheeler typically painted cityscapes and industrial architecture as exemplified by his painting Amoskeag Canal 1948.

=== Main schools and movements of American modernism ===
- the Stieglitz group
- the Arensberg circle
- color painters
- Precisionism
- the Independents
- the Philadelphia school
- New York independents
- Chicago and westward

==== Modernist painting ====
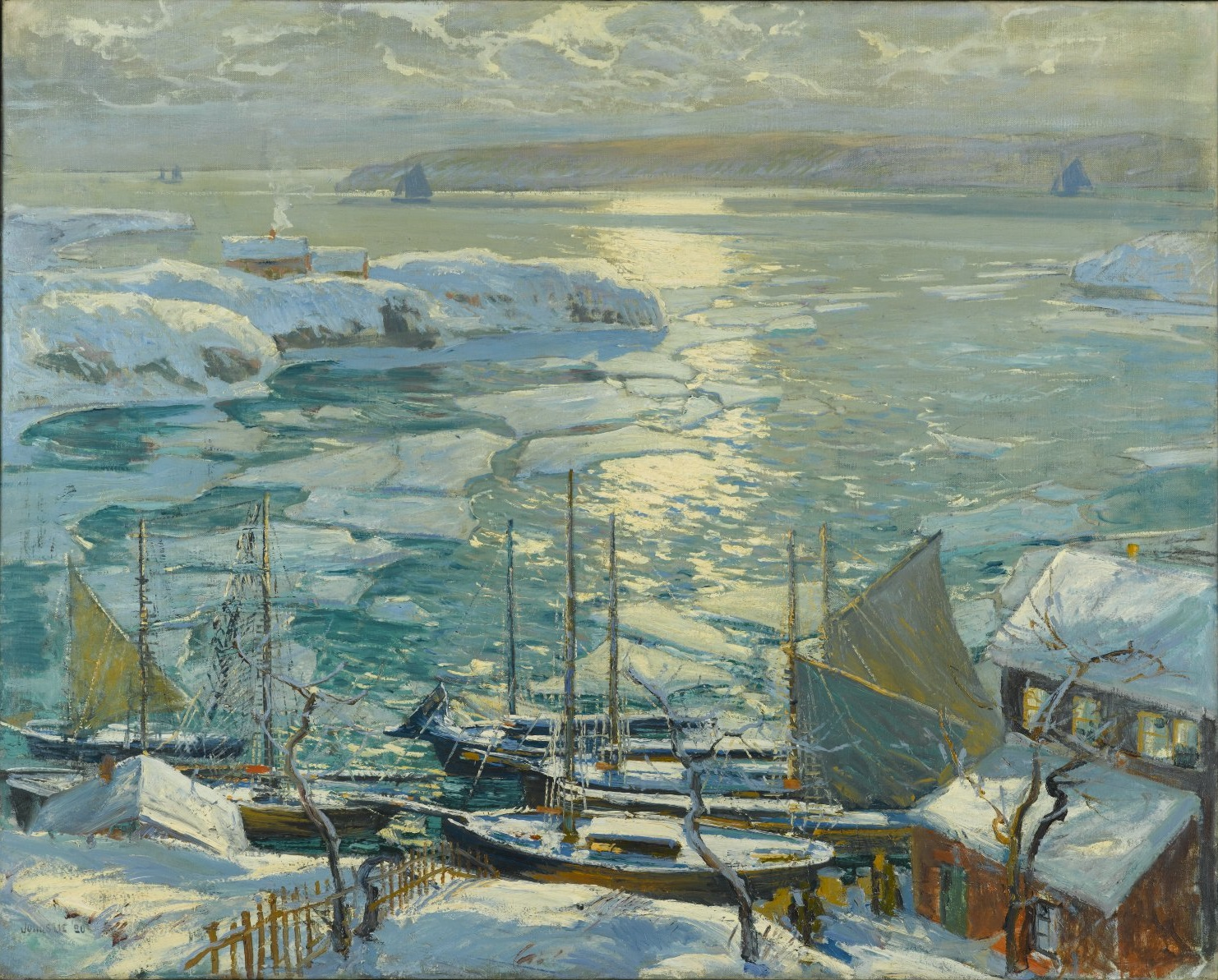
The Old Ships Draw to Home Again 1920 American Realism by Jonas Lie

Arthur Dove Me and the Moon 1937

Georgia O'Keeffe, known as the "Mother of American modernism", has been a major figure in American Modernism since the 1920s. She has received widespread recognition, for challenging the boundaries of modern American artistic style. She is chiefly known for paintings of flowers, rocks, shells, animal bones and landscapes in which she synthesized abstraction and representation. She is among those American modernism artists, who visualized economic status through the subjects of performance and leisure. While Greta Grossman, Louisa Keyser, Maurice Martiné, Isamu Noguchi, Horace Pippin, and Joseph Stella painted rapid changes in American society through the subjects of urbanization, global war, industry, and migration.

Arthur Dove used a wide range of media, sometimes in unconventional combinations to produce his abstractions and his abstract landscapes. Me and the Moon from 1937 is a good example of an Arthur Dove abstract landscape and has been referred to as one of the culminating works of his career. Dove did a series of experimental collage works in the 1920s. He also experimented with techniques, combining paints like hand mixed oil or tempera over a wax emulsion.

African-American painter Aaron Douglas (1899-1979) is one of the best-known and most influential African-American modernist painters. His works contributed strongly to the development of an aesthetic movement that is closely related to distinct features of African-American heritage and culture. Douglas influenced African-American visual arts especially during the Harlem Renaissance.

One of Douglas' most popular paintings is The Crucifixion. It was published in James Weldon Johnson's God's Trombones in 1927. The crucifixion scene that is depicted in the painting shows several elements that constitute Douglas' art: clear-cut delineation, change of shadows and light, stylized human bodies and geometric figures as concentric circles in contrast to linear forms. The painting's theme resembles not only the biblical scene but can also be seen as an allusion to African-American religious tradition: the oversized, dark Jesus is bearing his cross, his eyes directed to heaven from which light is cast down onto his followers. Stylized Roman soldiers are flanking the scene with their pointed spears. As a result, the observer is reminded for instance of the African-American gospel tradition but also of a history of suppression. Beauford Delaney, Charles Alston, Jacob Lawrence and Romare Bearden were also important African-American Modernist painters that inspired generations of artists that followed them.

==== Modernist photography ====
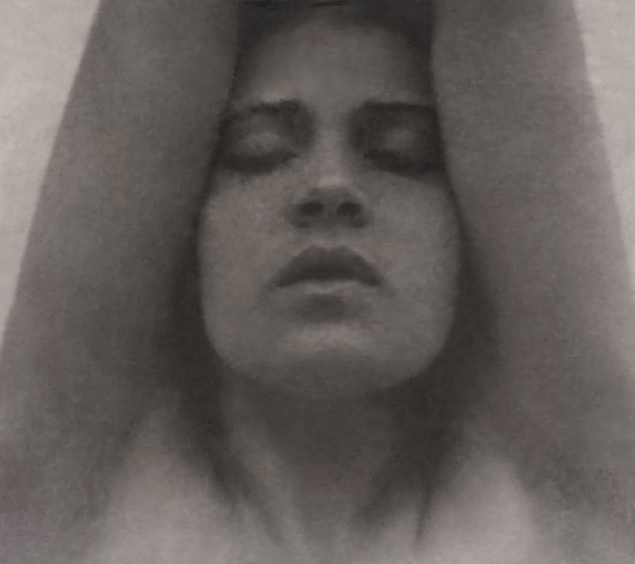
Tina Modotti with her arms raised by Edward Weston circa 1921

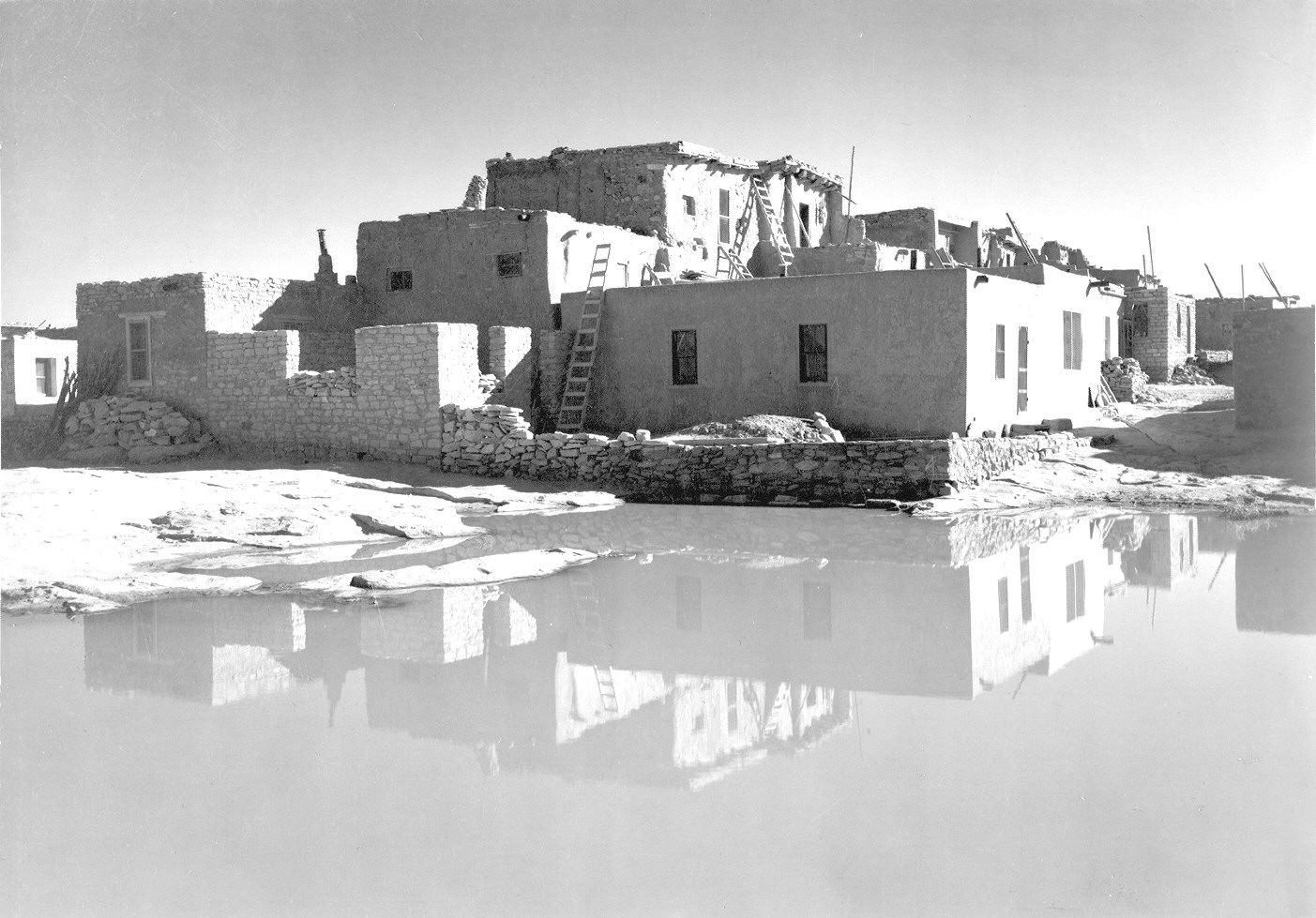
Acoma Pueblo by Ansel Adams 1941-1942

At the beginning of American modernism, photography still struggled to be recognized as a form of art. The photographer Alfred Stieglitz described it as: "Artists who saw my earlier photographs began to tell me that they envied me; that they felt my photographs were superior to their paintings, but that, unfortunately, photography was not an art. I could not understand why the artists should envy me for my work, yet, in the same breath, decry it because it was machine-made." (Stieglitz:8). In 1902, Stieglitz founded the Photo-Secession group with members such as Edward Steichen, Gertrude Käsebier and Clarence Hudson White, which had the objective of raising the standard and increasing the awareness of art photography. At that point, their main style was pictorialist, which was known for modifying photos through soft focus, special filters or exotic printing processes, to imitate the style of paintings and etchings of that time. For means of publication, Stieglitz, as the driving force of the movement, started the magazine Camera Work, in which he published artists he felt represented the movement. He also ran three galleries one after another, namely "291" (1905–1917), "The Intimate Gallery" (1925–1929) and "An American Place" (1929–1947). Especially 291 served as a meeting point for artists and writers and was the first to exhibit the early modernist art works of European artists, such as Henri Matisse, Auguste Rodin, Henri Rousseau, Paul Cézanne, and Pablo Picasso, in the United States. A further link to the European avant-garde was established by Man Ray. Born in America and inspired by the work he saw in Stieglitz' galleries, Ray emigrated to Paris in 1921 and together with artists of the European Dada and Surrealist movements created new photographic techniques such as rayographs (placing objects directly on photosensitive paper).

In the early 1920s, photographers moved towards what they called straight photography. In contrast to the pictorialist style, they now rejected any kind of manipulation in the photographic process (e.g., soft lens, special developing or printing methods) and tried to use the advantages of the camera as a unique medium for capturing reality. Their motifs were supposed to look as objective as possible. Turning the focus away from classic portraiture and the pictorialist style, the photographers started using their pictures as means for representing the harsh realities of everyday life, but at the same time tried to search for the beauty in the detail or the overall aesthetical structure. Machines and factory work, sky scrapers and technical innovations became prominent motifs. In 1932 some younger photographers (e.g. Ansel Adams, Imogen Cunningham, Willard Van Dyke, Edward Weston) started Group f/64 based on the ideals of straight photography, which became the most progressive association of its time.

== American modernist literature ==
American modernist literature was a dominant trend in American literature between World War I and World War II. The modernist era highlighted innovation in the form and language of poetry and prose, as well as addressing numerous contemporary topics, such as race relations, gender and the human condition. Many American modernists became expatriated in Europe during this time, often becoming stalwarts in the European movement, as was the case for T. S. Eliot, Ezra Pound and Gertrude Stein. These writers were often known as the Lost Generation.

As a reaction to this trend, many American authors and poets began a trend of 'nativism', seeking to represent the modern American experience in America. Notable contributors to this trend include William Carlos Williams, Wallace Stevens and Marianne Moore. These poets were often critical of the works of expatriate writers such as Eliot and Pound, as evidenced by poems like Spring and All.

Influenced by the first World War, many American modernist writers explored the psychological wounds and spiritual scars of the war experience. The economic crisis in America at the beginning of the 1930s also left a mark on literature, such as John Steinbeck's The Grapes of Wrath. A related issue is the loss of self and need for self-definition, as workers faded into the background of city life, unnoticed cogs within a machine yearning for self-definition. American modernists echoed the mid-19th-century focus on the attempt to "build a self"—a theme illustrated by Fitzgerald's The Great Gatsby. Madness and its manifestations seems to be another favorite modernist theme, as seen in Eugene O'Neill's The Emperor Jones, Hemingway's The Battler and Faulkner's That Evening Sun. Nevertheless, all these negative aspects led to new hopes and aspirations, and to the search for a new beginning, not only for the contemporary individuals, but also for the fictional characters in American modernist literature.

Modernist literature also allowed for the development of regional trends within American literature, including the Harlem Renaissance and southern modernism. The Harlem Renaissance marked a rebirth for African American arts, centralized in the Harlem area of New York. Writers and thinkers such as Alain Locke, Claude McKay, Langston Hughes and Zora Neale Hurston were among the key figures of the movement. The movement was connected to a vogue for African American culture, as seen too in the popularity of Jazz music, with many writers financed by white patrons. Many writers of this movement used modernist techniques to represent African American life, for instance incorporating the rhythms of Jazz music and dialects of African American culture into poetry and prose. Southern modernism similarly represented the life and unique experiences of the South using modernist aesthetics, with celebrated figures including William Faulkner and Tennessee Williams.

=== The new criticism in America ===
From the 1930s to the 1960s, New Criticism became a critical force in the United States. It was the most powerful perspective in American literary criticism. The representatives were John Crowe Ransom, Allen Tate, Cleanth Brooks, Robert Penn Warren. "The influential critical methods these poet-professors developed emphasized the sharpening of close reading skills. New Criticism privileged the evaluation of poetry as the justification of literary scholarship". Brooks and Warren's Understanding Poetry (1938) became one of the most influential college poetry textbooks of the 1930s and was revised and reprinted well into the 1970s. (Morrisson: 29).

New criticism showed itself in such works as Eliot's and Yeats' poems. "Poetry that best fit the aesthetic criteria of the New Critics was emphasized in important classroom teaching anthologies" (Morrisson: 29). T. S. Eliot redefined tradition in his essay "Tradition and the Individual Talent". He formulated such critical concepts as "objective correlative", and rethought the literary canon in his elevation of Jacobean drama and metaphysical poetry. His work had a fundamental influence on New Criticism in America.

== Architecture and space ==
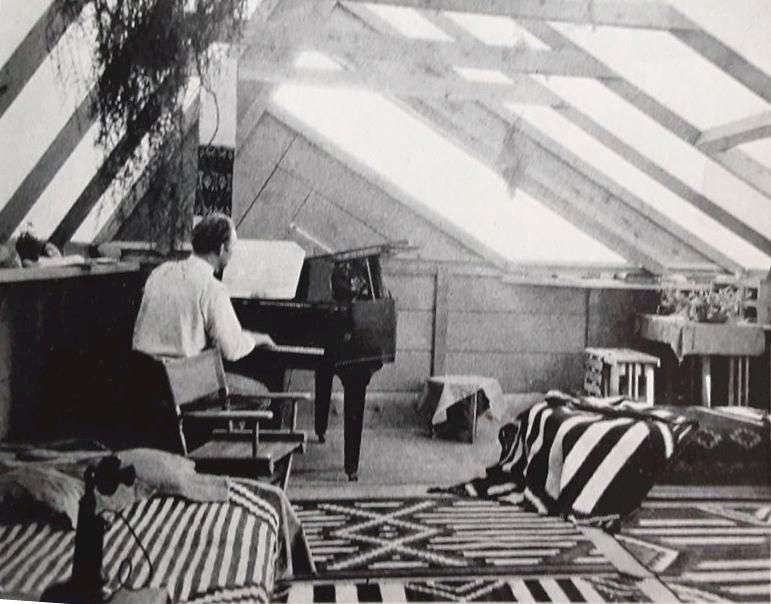
The cabin of Frank Lloyd Wright at Ocotillo, Chandler Arizona in 1929

The United States played a great role in the modernism movement concerning new advanced building and construction technologies. Among construction innovations there are such materials as iron, steel and reinforced concrete.

Louis Henry Sullivan headed the so-called Chicago school of architecture, which was distinct by its development of functional design along with modern materials. Sullivan's follower Frank Lloyd Wright developed a new and original approach to residential design before World War I, which became known as the "prairie style." It combined open planning principles with horizontal emphasis, asymmetrical facade elevations, and broad, sheltering roofs. The Robie House in Chicago (1909) and the Guggenheim Museum in New York City (1946-1959) are two of his seminal works. Wright became a renowned architect and his architectural designs were built in Los Angeles, Wisconsin, Arizona, and the San Francisco Bay Area. He disdained urbanization, but was taken by San Francisco which he regarded as beautiful. In his works Wright moved closer and closer to an earth-bound sense of natural form, using rough-hewn stone and timber and aiming always in his houses to achieve an effect of intimate and protective shelter.

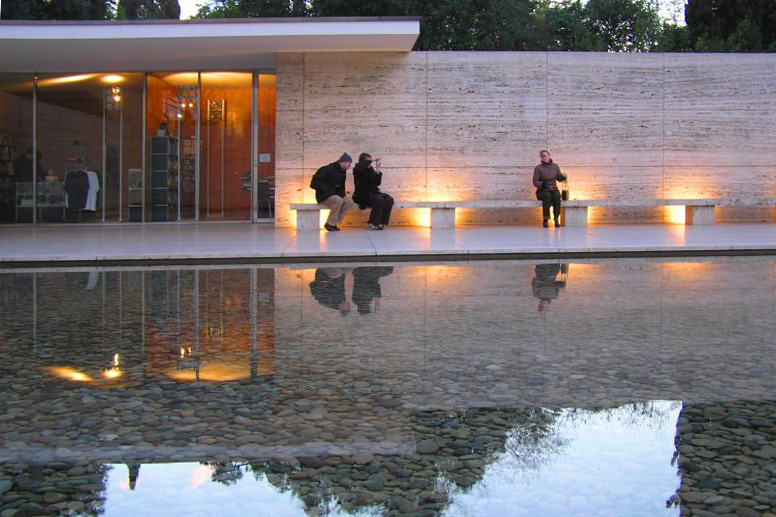
The German Pavillion in Barcelona, Spain 1929 by Mies van der Rohe

Foreign-born architects as Richard Neutra, Rudolf Schindler, and William Lescaze during the 1920s played a great role in development of American architecture performing later a style, which got the name of international style and was reflected in the design of corporate office buildings after World War II. Such buildings as Skidmore, Owings and Merrill's Lever House (1952) and Mies van der Rohe's Seagram Building (1956–58) in New York City are the examples of this new style. When such famous Europeans as Walter Gropius and Mies immigrated to the United States, many American architectural schools went under the influence of the traditions of the Bauhaus in Germany.

== See also ==
- American Modern
- American realism
- American Union of Decorative Artists and Craftsmen
- Beat Generation
- Mid-Century modern
- Visual arts of the United States
- Modernist film
