= The Anisette Bottle =

1914 painting by Juan Gris

The Anisette Bottle (1914) by Juan Gris

The Anisette Bottle is a 1914 painting by Juan Gris, now in the Museo Nacional Centro de Arte Reina Sofía in Madrid. It shows a bottle of anisette, specifically the Spanish brand Anís del Mono, with the names of Badalona, Madrid and Paris, all linked with the leaders of the Cubist movement, namely Gris himself, Pablo Picasso and Georges Braque.
