= Claude Minière =

- Born: October 25, 1938 (age 87); Paris
- Occupations: Essayist and poet
- Notable work: Comment peut-on être cartésien? Editions Tituli, Paris,2021 ISBN 978-2-37365-147-8

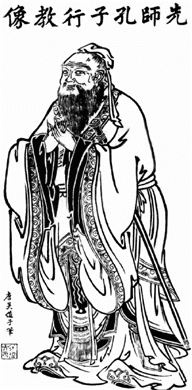
Pound's Canto LIII: from the foundation of the Xia dynasty to Confucius (above)

Claude Minière (born October 25, 1938) is an essayist and poet. Initially, he took part in various avant-garde activities before turning towards a more solitary, more classical approach to writing, never forgetting, however, the conquests of Rimbaud, Ezra Pound and free-verse.

Minière was born in Paris. For fifteen years he taught at l'Ecole des Beaux-Arts and is the author of a "panorama" of artistic creativity in France between 1965 and 1996: L'art en France 1965-1995 (Nouvelles editions françaises, Paris, 1995). Together with Margaret Tunstill, he translated two works by Ezra Pound: Henri Gaudier-Brzeska, A Memoir (Henri Gaudier-Brzeska, ed. Tristram, 1992) and Treatise on Harmony (Traité d'Harmonie, ed. Julien Salvy, 1980). In addition to the many collections of his poetry he has produced three remarkable essays : Pound caractère chinois (ed. Gallimard); Barnett Newman (ed. Tarabuste); and Descartes (ed. Tituli).

== Bibliography ==
- L'Application des lectrices aux champs, Éditions du Seuil, 1968; poetry; ISBN 978-2-02-001682-7
- Glamour, Christian Bourgois Éditeur, 1979; novel
- Lucrèce, Flammarion, 1997; poetry; ISBN 978-2-08-067508-8
- La trame d'or, Éditions Aleph, 1999; poetry; ISBN 978-2-913351-01-1
- Balthus, Georges Fall éd., 2000; essay; ISBN 978-2-910667-11-5
- Le Temps est un dieu dissipé, Tarabuste, 2000; poetry; ISBN 978-2-84587-007-9
- Hymne, Tarabuste, 2002; poetry; ISBN 978-2-84587-035-2
- Traité du scandale, Rouge Profond, coll. "Stanze", 2005; essay; ISBN 978-2-915083-18-7
- Perfection, Rouge Profond, coll. "Stanze", 2005; poetry; ISBN 978-2-915083-17-0
- Pound caractère chinois, Gallimard, coll. "L'Infini", 2006; essay ISBN 2-07-078220-4
- Notes sur le départ, Tarabuste, 2008; novel; ISBN 978-2-84587-153-3
- Je/hiéroglyphe, Tarabuste, 2011; poetry; ISBN 978-2-84587-227-1
- Barnett Newman, Retour vers l'Eden, Tarabuste, 2012; essayISBN 978-2-84587-261-5
- La trame d'or, collection PaRDèS, , Marie Delarbre Éditions, 2013; poetry; ISBN 978-2-913351-22-6 (republication of the 1999 edition, by Aleph).
- "Le théâtre de verdure", collection Les carnets noctambules, Marie Delarbre Éditions, 2013; poetic essay; ISBN 978-2-913351-21-9.
- Gueule noire, limited edition, with two engravings by M. Pérez, Carte Blanche, 2015.
- " Encore cent ans pour Melville", Gallimard, 2018.ISBN 978-2-07-274156-2
- "Courbet, marée montante", invenit ed., 2019; ISBN 978-2-37680-005-7
- "Un coup de dés", editions Tinbad, 2019; ISBN 979-10-96415-25-0
- "Itus et reditus", Le corridor bleu, 2020.ISBN 978-2-914033-86-2
- "Refaire le monde", Gallimard, coll. Blanche, ISBN 978-2-07-286990-7.
- "Comment peut-on être cartésien?", tituli, Paris, ISBN 978-2-37365-147-8.
- "L'Espace entre l'éclair et le tonnerre", Gallimard, 2022, ISBN 978-2-07-294527-4.
- "Consolation", Gallimard, 2023, ISBN 978-2-07-299586-6.
