= Alfred Henry Maurer =

American painter

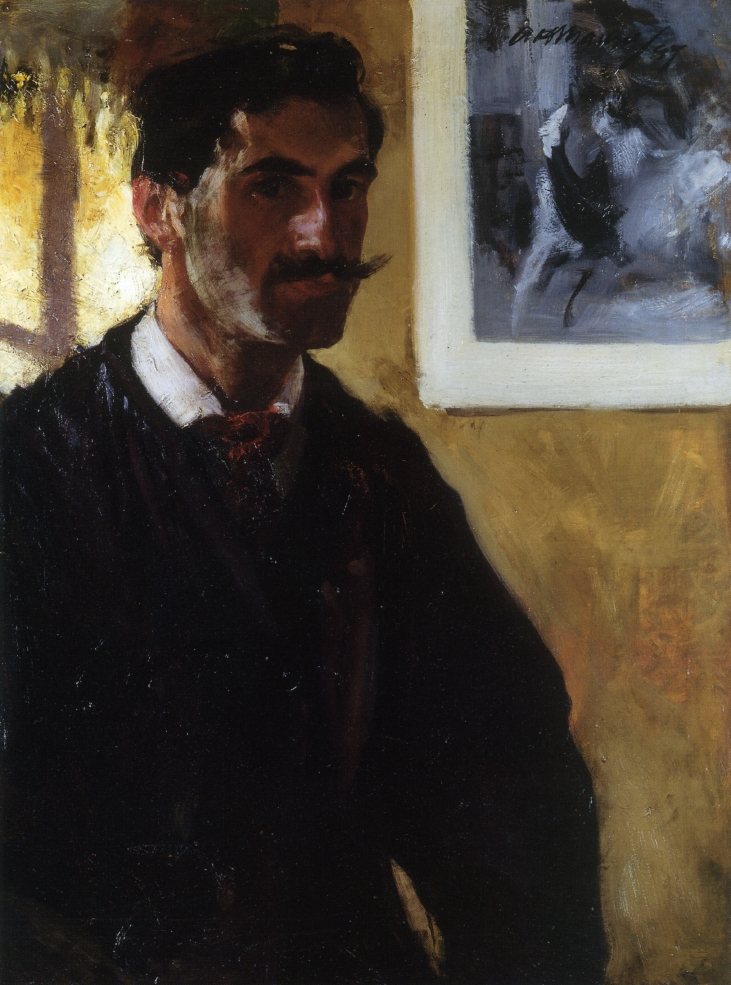
- "Self portrait" (1897)
- Born: April 21, 1868; New York City, US
- Died: August 4, 1932 (aged 64)
- Known for: Painting

Alfred Henry Maurer (April 21, 1868 – August 4, 1932) was an American modernist painter. He exhibited his work in avant-garde circles internationally and in New York City during the early twentieth century. Highly respected today, his work met with little critical or commercial success in his lifetime, and he died, a suicide, at the age of sixty-four.

== Early life and education ==
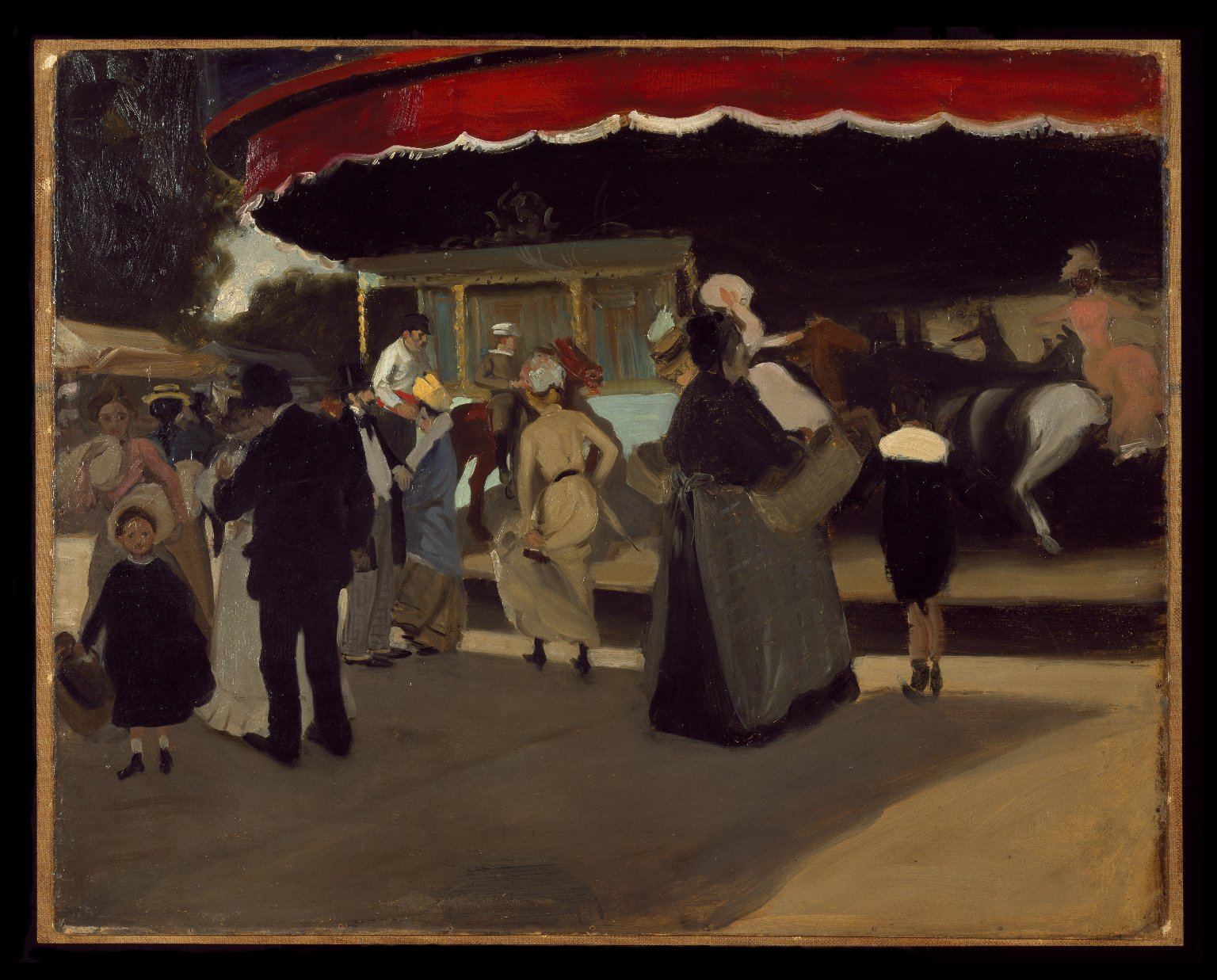
Carousel, c. 1901-1902, Brooklyn Museum

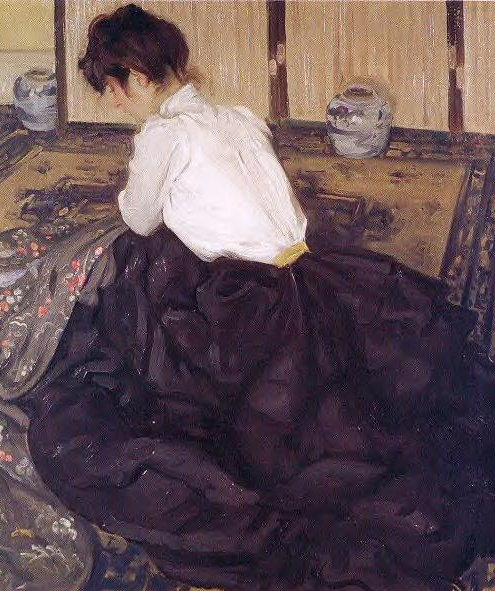
"An Arrangement". 1901; oil on cardboard

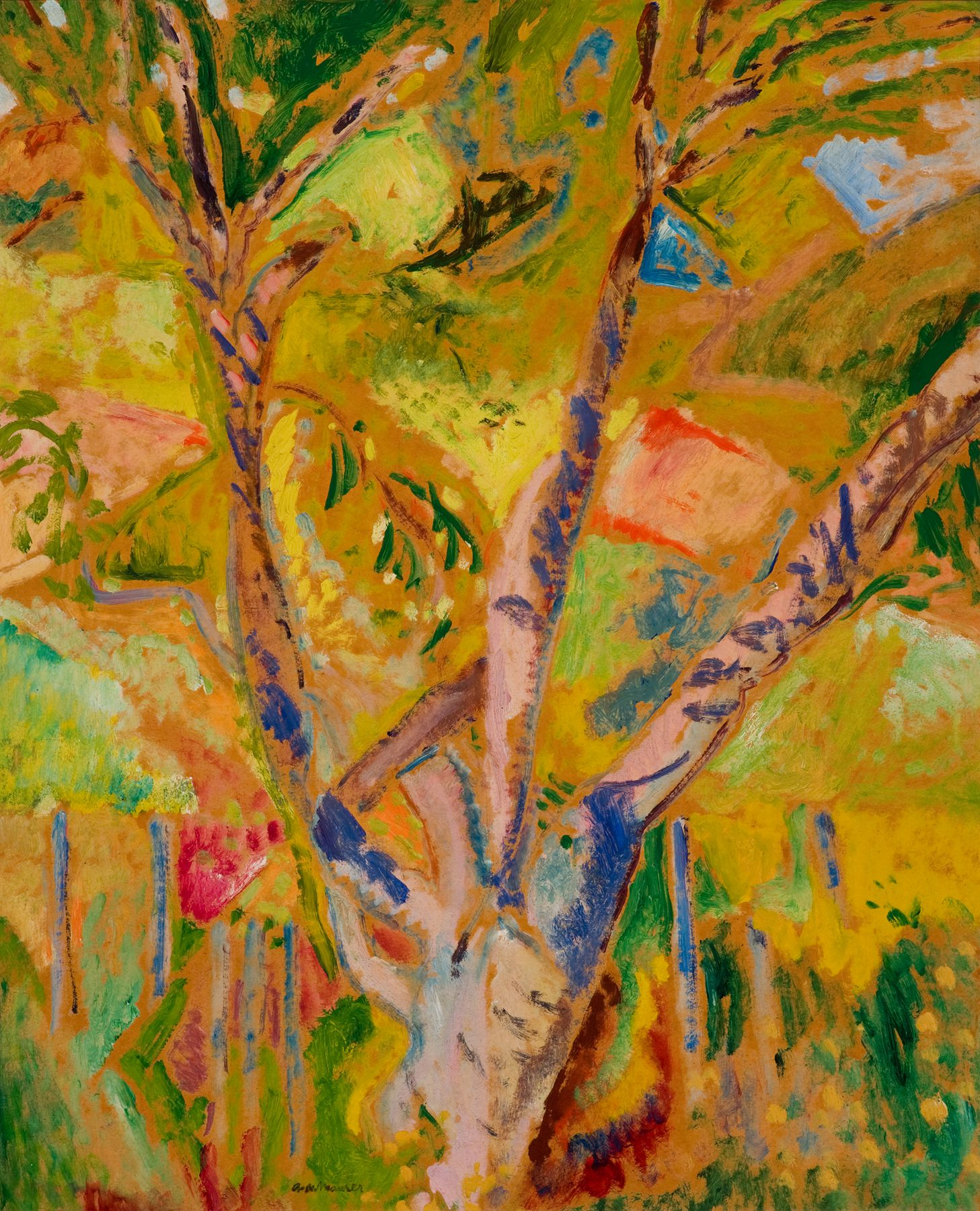
Landscape of Provence, c. 1912–1922, Reynolda House Museum of American Art

Maurer was born in New York City. He was the son of German-born Louis Maurer, a lithographer with a pronounced disdain for modern art. At age sixteen, Maurer had to quit school to work at his father's lithographic firm. In 1897, after studying with the sculptor John Quincy Adams Ward and painter William Merritt Chase, Maurer left for Paris, where he stayed the next four years, joining a circle of American and French artists.

== Career ==
Finding the instruction at the Academie Julian too limited, he spent most of his time copying in the Louvre. His self-portrait from that time expresses the 'youthful optimism" of that period of his life. At the time, Maurer worked in a conventional but self-assured realist style.

Maurer's An Arrangement, which was compared to the work of Whistler in its color sense and fluid handling of paint, made his reputation in the American art world. Comparisons were made to Chase and Sargent. The painting received first prize at the 1901 Carnegie International Exhibition, whose jurors included Thomas Eakins and Winslow Homer. It was an honor that promised a bright future, and Maurer hoped it would convince his demanding and skeptical father that he could, in fact, paint. Other awards received by Maurer included the Inness Jr. Prize of the Salmagundi Club in 1900 and a bronze medal at the Pan-American Exposition at Buffalo, New York in 1901. In 1905, he won the third medal at the Liege (Belgium) Exposition and a gold medal at the International Exposition in Munich. A successful future beckoned.

Yet, at age thirty-six, in Paris, deviating from what everyone (including himself, at times) called "acceptable" painting styles, Maurer changed his methods sharply and from that point on painted only in a cubist and fauvist manner. His break from realism and new commitment to modernism, fostered by exposure to the art collected by his friends Gertrude and Leo Stein, subsequently cost him his international reputation and any hope of paternal regard. He had a two-man exhibition with John Marin in New York City at Alfred Stieglitz's 291 gallery, and four of his paintings were included in the legendary Armory Show of 1913. He acquired esteem in avant-garde circles. He did not, however, find the popular following he needed to make a living.

Leaving Paris on the eve of World War I, he returned to his father's house only to be denied support. It was the beginning, as art critic Robert Hughes wrote, of "a banishment to a hell of Oedipal conflict." For the next seventeen, increasingly depressed years, Maurer painted in a garret in his father's house on the West Side of Manhattan and gained only limited critical acclaim. He was friends with respected avant-garde American artists like Arthur Dove, Marsden Hartley, and John Marin, almost all of whom were better known than he was. He participated in prestigious exhibitions, such as "The Forum Exhibition of Modern American Painters" in 1916, a New York show which featured seventeen of the most significant native modernists of the time. He also exhibited regularly at the New York-based Society of Independent Artists and was elected their director in 1919. In 1924, the New York dealer Erhard Weyhe bought the contents of Maurer's studio and represented the artist for the remainder of his career. The death of his mother in 1917, however, intensified his gradual withdrawal from the world.

The artist Jerome Myers wrote poignantly of him in his autobiography, Artist In Manhattan:

Alfred Maurer, whom I knew casually, had a pleasant personality. After his early talent had brought him a prize at the Carnegie Institute, he went to Paris, where he stayed for years ... There was no doubt that he was happy in his Parisian atmosphere. Like many other young Americans there, he was attracted by the life of the boulevards, the cares, the daily affinity with brother artists with whom he was then studying the problem of color ... His father, Louis Maurer, was an old-time artist, who had worked on the Currier & Ives lithographs. When I met him at an exhibition of the Independents at the Grand Central Palace, he was a quiet-mannered man, whom I took to be about seventy-five years old. Later I learned that he was then already ninety-five ... Speaking of his son, Alfred, he evidently could not sympathize with—or, as he said, understand—the ultra-violets and ultra-blues of that phase of Alfred's work. He seemed so proud of what his son had done, but so grieved at what he was then doing. For some reason, Alfred was subsequently forced to return to New York, leaving behind in Paris his beloved boulevards and the friends of his heart. The idea and the style of his work seemed to change; he turned to the painting of elongated women, after the pattern of Modigliani. Then Louis Maurer, seemingly outraged by his son's work, did an extraordinary thing. He gave an exhibition of his own paintings at the age of one hundred years, a record for all time. Between this unique rejuvenescence of his remarkable father, with the implied reproof against his own art, and the suffering due to ill health, the pit yawned and the unhappy Alfred Maurer left the scene of his sorrows a suicide, his gallant heart broken.

About his approach to painting after abandoning realism, Maurer commented, "My main concern in painting is the beautiful arrangement of color values -- that is, harmonized masses of pigment, more or less pure. For this reason, it is impossible to present an exact transcription of nature....It is necessary for art to differ from nature....Perhaps art should be an intensification of nature; at least it should express an inherent feeling which cannot be obtained from nature except through a process of association....The artist must be free to paint his effects. Nature must not bind him."

As the art historian Sheldon Reich observed, had Maurer been a European or remained in Europe in 1914, he would probably be discussed today in the same terms applied to Vlaminck or Derain. Instead, he became a citizen of a country with very limited interest in bold artistic experimentation and took his place as part of that "tragic fraternity of artists who during their lifetimes have suffered the tortures of neglect." He enjoys a marginal status in most American art history textbooks. It is also extremely difficult to encounter Maurer's paintings in public collections as most of his work is still privately owned.

Maurer took his own life by hanging several weeks after his father's death at the age of 100. He was interred at Green-Wood Cemetery in Brooklyn, New York. Alfred Stieglitz wanted to arrange a posthumous exhibition of his work at his gallery, An American Place, but was unable to do so. Five years after Maurer's death, the art critic Henry McBride, reviewing a show of his work at the Hudson Walker Gallery in New York, wrote: "He lived exclusively for his art and in sharp contrast to most painters of today who never lift a paint brush to canvas without thought of the box office results....he had the courage of his principles."

Maurer's works are included in the collections of the Barnes Foundation, Philadelphia, Pennsylvania; the Brooklyn Museum, New York; the Carnegie Museum of Art, Pittsburgh, Pennsylvania; the Art Institute of Chicago, Illinois; the Crystal Bridges Museum of American Art, Bentonville, Arkansas; the Metropolitan Museum of Art, New York; the Philadelphia Museum of Art, Pennsylvania; the Phillips Collection, Washington, D.C.; the Reynolda House Museum of American Art, Winston-Salem, North Carolina; the Smithsonian American Art Museum, Washington, D.C.; the Weisman Art Museum, University of Minnesota, Minneapolis; and the Whitney Museum of American Art, New York, among others.

== See also ==
- American modernism
- Little Galleries of the Photo-Secession

== Sources ==
- Brown, Milton. American Painting from the Armory Show to the Depression. Princeton: Princeton University Press, 1955.
- Davidson, Abraham A. Early American Modernist Painting, 1910-1935. New York: DaCapo, 1994.
- Deeds, Daphne Anderson. Alfred Maurer: The First American Modern. Minneapolis; University of Minnesota Press, 2003.
- Epstein, Stacey. "Alfred H. Maurer: Aestheticism to Modernism." Hollis Taggart Galleries, New York (November 30, 1999 - January 15, 2000). ASIN B0006RBPVA.
- Hughes, Robert. American Visions: The Epic History of Art in America. New York: Knopf, 1997.
- Hunter, Sam. Modern American Painting and Sculpture. New York: Dell, 1959.
- Loughery, John. "The Watercolors of Alfred Maurer." Arts Magazine (Summer 1985), pp. 124–125.
- Alfred Maurer (1868-1932), exhibition catalogue, Washington D.C.: National Collection of Fine Arts, 1973.
- McCausland, Elizabeth. A.H. Maurer. New York: Wyn, 1951.
