= Charles Mozley =

English painter (1914–1991)

- Born: 29 May 1914; Darnall, Sheffield
- Died: 11 January 1991 (aged 76); Kew, London
- Education: Sheffield School of Art; Camberwell School of Arts and Crafts
- Known for: Painting and illustrations
- Spouse: Eileen Kohn (m. 1938; died 1989)

Charles Alfred Mozley (29 May 1914 – 11 January 1991) was a British artist who was also a teacher. He was a prolific book illustrator and designer of book covers, posters and prints.

== Biography ==
Mozley was born in Darnall, Sheffield, and, while still a schoolboy, attended the Sheffield School of Art. An exhibition of his artworks were held at the Hibbert Brothers Gallery in the city in 1933. After spending 1933 teaching in Sheffield, Mozley won a scholarship to the Royal College of Art, RCA, in 1934. When he left the RCA in 1937, Mozley taught life drawing, anatomy and lithography at the Camberwell School of Arts and Crafts. He also quickly established himself as a freelance artist.

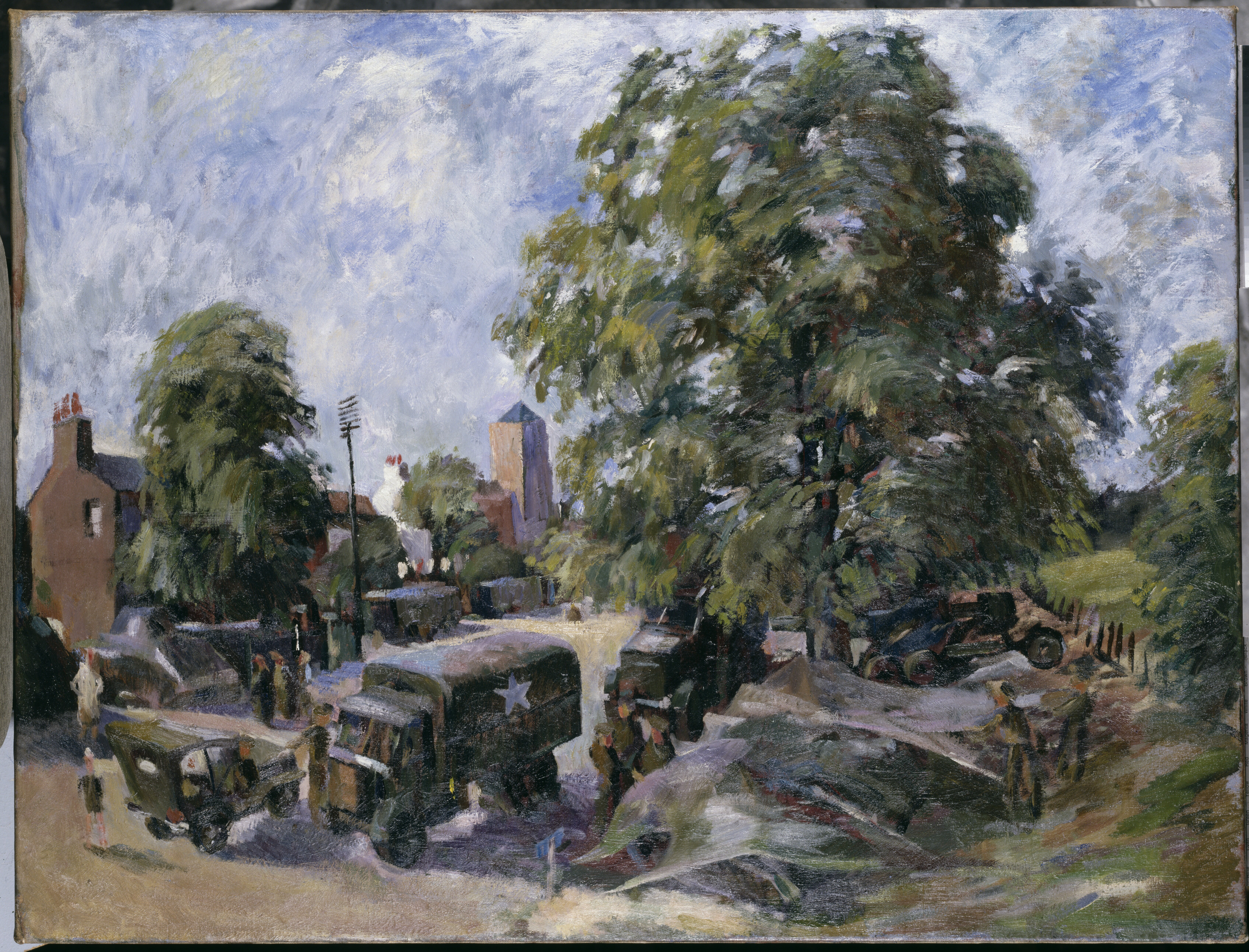
Invasion Preparations in an English Village (Art.IWM ART 15546)

At the start of the Second World War, Mozley joined the British Army and worked for military intelligence and on camouflage designs. In 1940, Mozley submitted a number of works to the War Artists' Advisory Committee. The Committee purchased one of these pieces, A Kentish Lane, 1940 and also issued Mozley with a wartime sketching permit which allowed him to paint outdoors, mainly in London and Plymouth, during the conflict. WAAC purchased at least one further work from Mozley in June 1944. Mozley was in the Royal Engineers, and retired with the rank of Acting Lieutenant-Colonel.

After the War, Mozley established himself as a prolific commercial artist working in different techniques. He designed film posters for Alexander Korda, theatre posters for the Lyric Theatre in Hammersmith and worked on mural designs for the Festival of Britain. As well as designing hundreds of book covers, Mozley created book illustrations for the Limited Editions Club of New York, the publishers Chatto and Windus and for the Folio Society. Interior decoration, drawings for television commercials and press adverts for British European Airways were also undertaken. Mozley designed posters for the London Underground, Shell and for Lyons tea-rooms. In 1979, a retrospective of Mozley's work was held at the King Street Gallery in London and his drawings of Venice were exhibited at Somerset House in support of the Venice in Peril Fund.

== Family life ==
While he was at the Royal College of Art, Mozley met Eileen Kohn, who was also an artist, and they married in 1938. Her sister Joan would later marry one of Mozley's contemporaries, Edwin La Dell. Mozley had two sons and three daughters. Mozley died of heart failure in 1991, surviving his wife by two years. From 1971 until his death, Mozley lived in Kew, in a house which he had bought from another artist, John Plant.

A retrospective exhibition of Mozley's lithographic work was held at the Barbican Centre library in 2002. The same year, Grey College in Durham also hosted an overview of his career. Three years later, the Barbican Centre held an exhibition of his artworks.
