= Hieratic Head of Ezra Pound =

Sculpture by Henri Gaudier-Brzeska

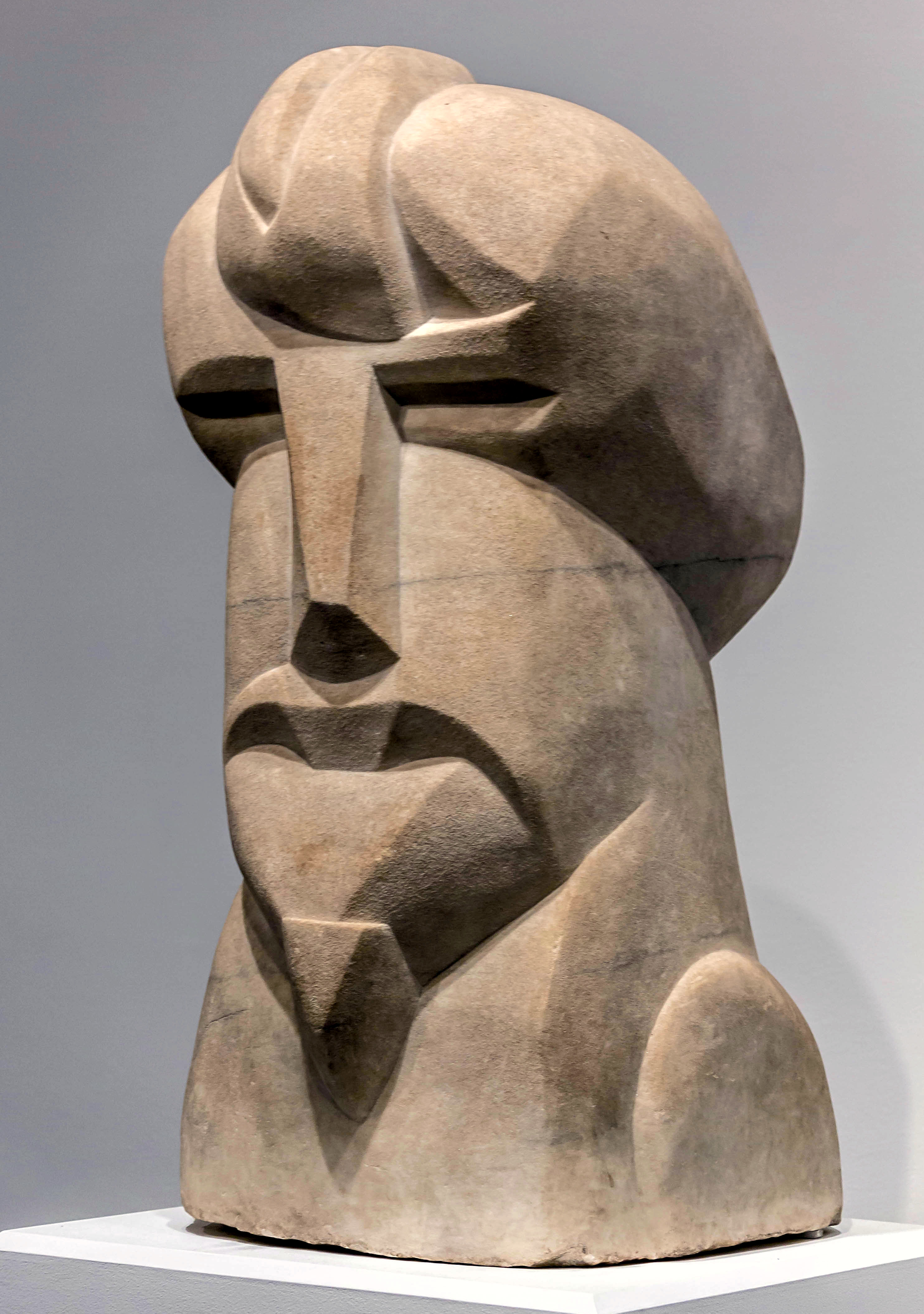
- Artist: Henri Gaudier-Brzeska
- Year: 1914
- Medium: marble
- Movement: Vorticism
- Subject: Ezra Pound
- Dimensions: 90.5 cm × 45.7 cm × 48.9 cm (35.6 in × 18.0 in × 19.3 in)
- Location: National Gallery of Art, Washington, D.C.
- Website: https://www.nga.gov/collection/art-object-page.143144.html

Hieratic Head of Ezra Pound is a Vorticist sculpture of the American poet Ezra Pound, made in marble by the French artist Henri Gaudier-Brzeska. It belonged to Pound for many years. Since 2009, it is in the collection of the National Gallery of Art in Washington, D.C.

== Description and history ==
Hieratic Head of Ezra Pound is a marble bust of the American poet Ezra Pound, stylized in an angular and simplified way. Pound's hair is compact and reminiscent of a turban. His eyes are dark, thin slots and his moustache and mouth are one piece. His nose looks like a noseguard from a medieval helmet but is also asymmetric and angled out at the top of the left side. Viewed from the back, the sculpture looks like a penis with a scrotum and a large glans.

Craig Raine of The Guardian calls it a great work that avoids being bland through the use of asymmetry. He says photographs do not do it justice and likens it to "something found on Easter Island". He says the technique of carving directly in marble, without a clay or plaster model, gives it "an earnest of Vorticist energy, of vitalism". The Independent profiled it in 2013 as part of an article series on "great works".

The sculpture was first exhibited in 1914 at the Whitechapel Gallery in London, listed under the title Bust of Mr. Ezra Pound. It was purchased by the novelist Ford Madox Hueffer for two pounds and ten shillings. It then belonged to Pound and his estate until it was sold through Hirschl & Adler Galleries in New York in 1988 to Raymond and Nancy Nasher. It was gifted to the National Gallery of Art in 2009. In his short 1992 book Watermark, Joseph Brodsky described his having seen the sculpture at the home of Pound's companion, Olga Rudge, in the Calle Querini 252, on a visit accompanying Susan Sontag in November 1977.
