= Peter Adolf Persson =

Swedish painter (1862–1914)

Peter Alolf Persson
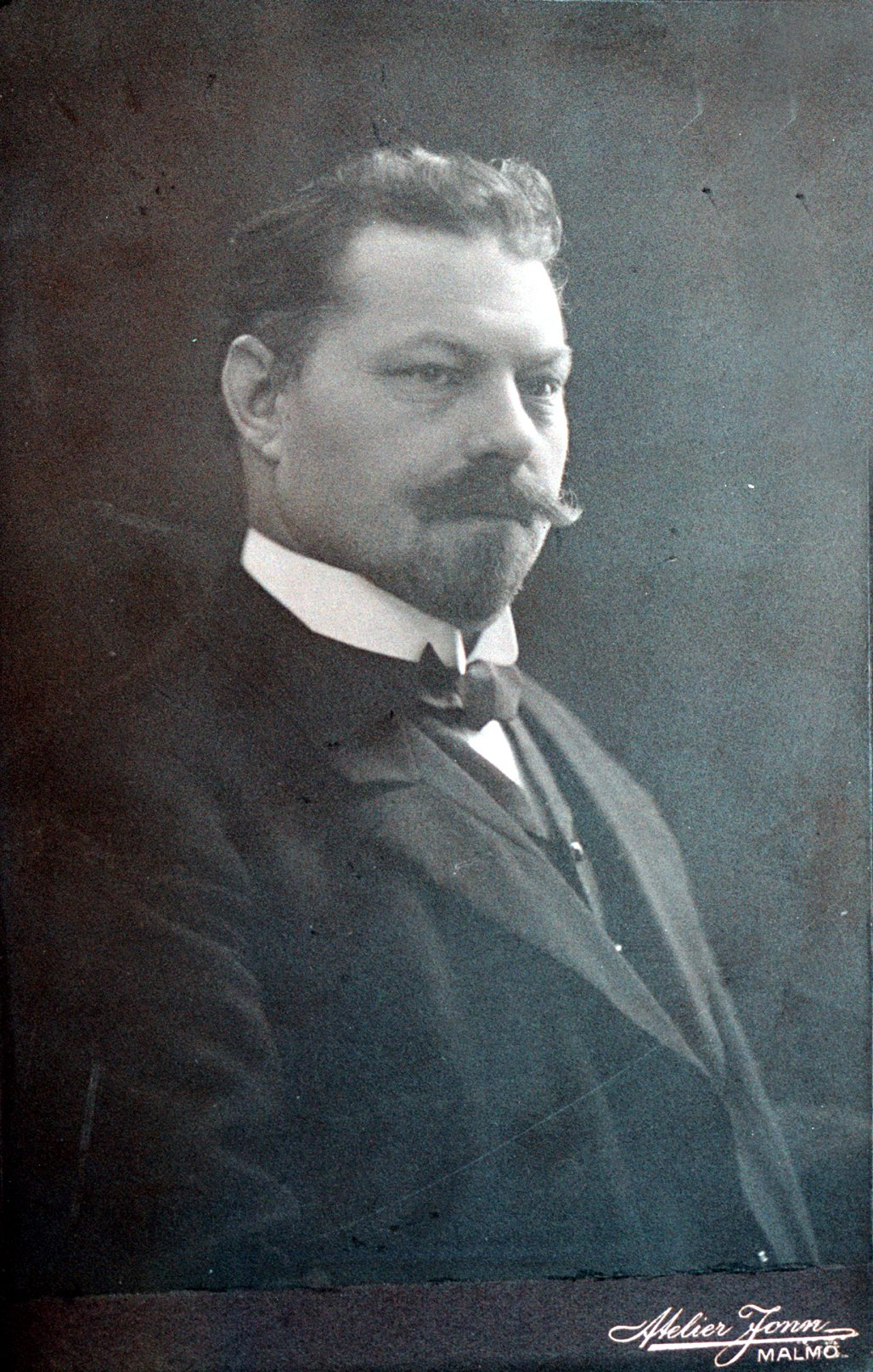
- Born: September 25, 1862; Kvistofa, Sweden
- Died: January 15, 1914 (aged 51); Tyringe, Sweden
- Education: Royal Swedish Academy of Fine Arts
- Known for: Skåne landscapes

Peter Adolf Persson (September 25, 1862 – January 15, 1914) was a Swedish painter known for his Skåne landscapes.

== Biography ==
Persson was born in the parish of Kvistofa in Skåne, Sweden. He studied at the Royal Swedish Academy of Fine Arts in Stockholm from 1882 to 1886 where he trained under Per Daniel Holm (1835-1903). During his stay in France from 1889 to 1890, he stayed west of Paris at Suresnes.

He exhibited at Valands in Gothenburg in 1911 and Helsingborg in 1913. He participated at the Paris Salon in 1890, Nordic Exhibition of 1888 at Copenhagen, Norrköping Exhibition of Art and Industry in 1906, Lund Exhibition in 1907 and Baltic Exhibition at Malmö in 1914.

Noted for his local Skane landscapes, his work is represented in the Nationalmuseum, Malmo Museum, Helsingborg, Landskrona Museum and the Lund University Art Museum.

He died during 1914 at Tyringe in Skåne .

== Gallery ==
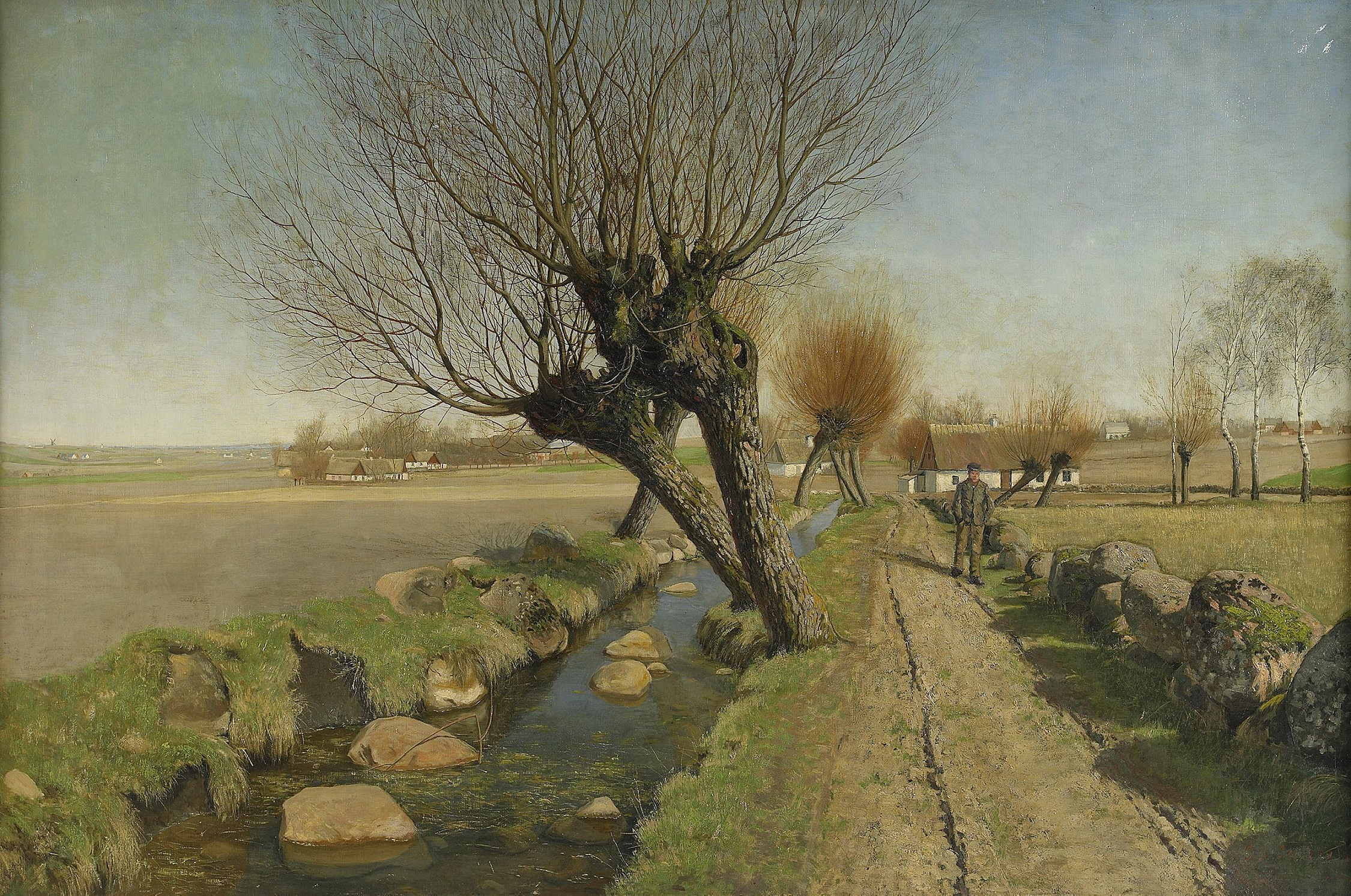
View over the Landscape of Skåne, 1889, oil on canvas

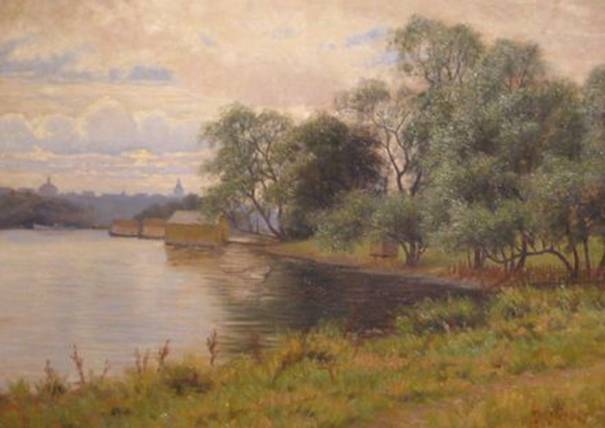
Landscape, before 1914
