= Béla Spányi =

Hungarian painter

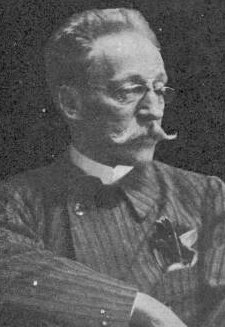
Béla Spányi (date unknown)

Béla Spányi (19 March 1852, Pest – 12 June 1914, Budapest) was a Hungarian painter who specialized in landscapes.

He studied in Vienna, Munich and Paris and spent much of his time in Szolnok, a popular gathering place for artists. He was one of the assistants who worked with Árpád Feszty to produce his monumental cyclorama Arrival of the Hungarians.
