= Edwin La Dell =

British printmaker (1914-1970)

Thomas Edwin La Dell
- Born: Thomas Edwin La Dell; 7 January 1914; Rotherham, Yorkshire, England
- Died: 27 June 1970 (aged 56); Maidstone, Kent, England
- Education: Sheffield School of Art; Royal College of Art, under John Nash and Barnett Freedman
- Known for: Printmaking, lithography, illustration, painting
- Notable work: Oxford, Cambridge, Kent and New York series
- Spouse(s): Joan Kohn (m. 1940–1970, his death); 1 son
- Elected: Royal Academy of Arts

Thomas Edwin La Dell ARA (7 January 1914 – 27 June 1970) was a British printmaker, lithographer, illustrator and painter active during the 1940s, 1950s and 1960s.

== Life and career ==
Edwin La Dell was the son of Thomas La Dell, a Sheffield-born bookbinder, and Ellen (née Boardman). He was christened Thomas (after his father and grandfather) Edwin (following a family tradition on his mother's side), but appears always to have been known as Edwin. After attending Sheffield School of Art, in 1935 he won a scholarship to study at the Royal College of Art under John Nash; he later became head of the Department of Lithography at the college from 1948 until his death in 1970. He was elected to the Royal Academy of Arts on 24 April 1969.

La Dell was appointed as an official war artist during the Second World War, working on both public murals and camouflage, but his best known works are those from the post-war era, in particular the lithographs he created for the coronation of Queen Elizabeth II, for the School Prints scheme, for Lyons Tea Rooms and his own series of Oxford, Cambridge, Kent and New York. His work was exhibited throughout the world during this period under the auspices of the British Council.

One of the artists La Dell worked with during the war was Charles Mozley, whose wife's sister, Joan Kohn, married La Dell in 1940.

La Dell's work is currently held in many collections, including those of the Royal Academy and the Government Art Collection.

La Dell died on 27 June 1970, aged 56.
