= Antonio Frixione =

Italian painter

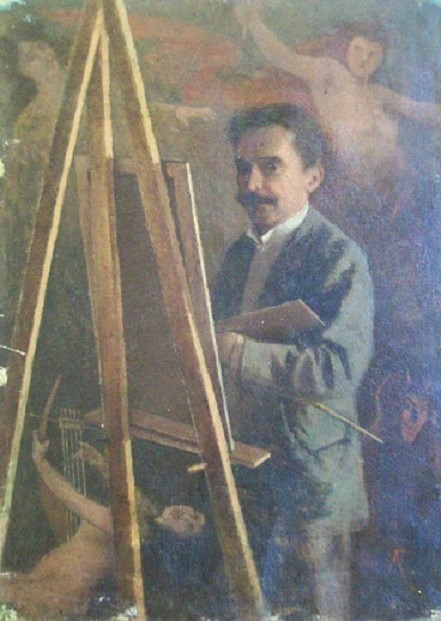
Antonio Frixione

Antonio Frixione (Italian: [anˈtɔːnjo friˈksjoːne], Ligurian: [fɾiˈʒuŋ]; January 8, 1843 – April 14, 1914) was an Italian landscape and portrait painter and printmaker.

== Biography ==
Frixione was born in Genoa, and educated in his native city at the Accademia Ligustica of Finea Arts, which he attended from 1859 to 1866. He studied painting and engraving under Giuseppe Frascheri and Raffaele Granara.

He became friends with and was influenced by Ernesto Rayper (1840–1873), Antonio Varni (1841–1908) and Giulio Monteverde (1837–1917). In 1882 he was appointed professor at the Accademia Albertina of Turin. In 1901 he was awarded as a Knight of the Order of the Crown of Italy by King Vittorio Emanuele III. Frixione was married with Fortunata Bafico and had two sons.

Frixione's paintings, often of small size, are characterized by a quiet atmosphere of peace and serenity, and almost a reluctance to express his feelings on the canvas. Soft, delicate brush touches stand out from his Ligurian landscapes. He also painted vivid portraits of famous persons and of simple people.

The spiritual aspect of the artist is evident in some works of religious nature (Christian) carried out mainly with paintings on carved wood. As an engraver he concentrated mainly on portraits; among his subjects were St Francis Maria of Camporosso (1804–1866), the violinist Ernesto Camillo Sivori (1815–1894) and Margaret of Savoy (1851–1926).

Antonio Frixione died in Genoa on April 14, 1914.

== Works ==
His works are mainly in private collections, and include:

- Fishermen on the sea of Levant
- The church ruins of Camaldoli
- The Duke of Galliera offers pier to homeland
- The Arco gate
- View of Gavi
- Huts of Marcarolo
- Bridge on the River
- The greengrocer woman
- The sailorman
- Francesco Maria da Camporosso (Holy Father)
- Margaret of Savoy
- Self-portrait

== Bibliography ==
- Ligurian painter biographies.
- Dizionario degli Artisti Liguri, curated by Germano Beringheli; De Ferrari Editore 2006.
- Dizionario Pittori Liguri ‘800 e ‘900; Gianluigi e Giuseppe Costa; gallery editrice.
- Pittori Liguri dell’800 e del primo 900 Giuseppe Costa; SAGEP Editrice Genova 1994.
- Genova, il Novecento, curated by Giuseppe Marcenaro; Catalogo della Mostra Genova Centro dei Liguri; May20-July 10, 1986.
- A.M.Comanducci, II, 1971 p. 1304.
- Dizionario Enciclopedico Bolaffi, V, 1974 p. 164.
