= Blanch Ackers =

American folk artist

- Born: November 28, 1914; Pine Bluff, Arkansas
- Died: May 24, 2003 (aged 88); Ypsilanti, Michigan

Blanch Ackers (November 28, 1914 – May 24, 2003) was an African-American folk artist, who was born in Arkansas but spent most of her life in Michigan. She began drawing and painting while in her seventies, and her work has been acquired by the University of Michigan Museum of Art.

== Early life ==
Ackers was born in 1914 in Pine Bluff, Arkansas, to Paul (a poor sharecropper) and Harriet (Williams) Markham. She had one brother, James Markham.

== Career ==
She moved to the Detroit area with her brother in 1943 to work for a factory, as part of the Great Migration, then later to Ypsilanti, where she spent the rest of her life.

In 1985, Ackers began to work in the Willow Run School District as a foster grandparent, through a program run by Child and Family Services.

=== Art ===
While working as a teacher's aide at Ford Elementary School in Ypsilanti, the school's art teacher, Christine Hennessy, introduced her to drawing and watercolor painting. Her drawings, such as Homestead and Yellow Interior, often reflected her memories of growing up in Arkansas.

In 2002, the University of Michigan Museum of Art acquired five of her drawings.

On her work, Ackers once said, "I imagine it and I start drawing."

She was represented by the Pardee Collection.

== Later life ==
Ackers had one daughter, Birdes Lawrence Gardner, and two sons, Brodis Williams and Willie Williams. She died in 2003 at a nursing home.
