= Duilio Barnabè =

Italian painter

Duilio Barnabè (October 7, 1914 – October 7, 1961) was an Italian artist who lived and worked in Paris. He is known for his paintings of schematically simplified figures, still-lifes, and landscapes.

== Career ==
Barnabè was born in Bologna in 1914. His father was a shopkeeper. He studied art at the Accademia di Belle Arti in Bologna where his teachers included Giorgio Morandi. Barnabé served in the Italian army in North Africa in 1935. Upon returning to his home town he met a young sculptor, Angiola Cassanello, whom he married in 1938. During part of 1940 he was recalled into military service, but returned to Bologna afterward to concentrate on his art. He received the Baruzzi Prize in 1941 and the International Curlandese Prize in 1943.

In 1946 Barnabè relocated to Paris. His first exhibition outside Italy was in 1947, when he participated in an exhibition of contemporary Italian art at the Kunsthalle Bern in Switzerland. In 1948 he exhibited in the Quadriennale of Rome and the Venice Biennale, and in 1952 he had a solo exhibit in the Venice Biennale. In 1955 he was awarded a gold medal by the government for a series of stained-glass windows he designed for the church of San Nicolao della Flüe in Lugano. In 1957 he exhibited in the Musee de l’Athenee in Geneva, Switzerland.

He achieved recognition for his paintings of schematically ordered figures, still-lifes, and landscapes. He favored cool, subdued colors and sharply drawn edges. Backgrounds were usually monochromatic, and provided no details that would suggest a particular time or place. Flowers on a tabletop were a frequent subject, as were nuns, emblematic of his Catholic upbringing. In 1959 the art critic Dennis Farr said the influence of de Chirico and Metaphysical painting was evident in Barnabè's "starkly drawn puppet-like figures sliced geometrically into chiaroscuro".

Barnabè's work was at its most abstract in the mid-1950s, as he reduced figures and still lifes to geometrical symbols. By the late 1950s his allegiance to realism caused him to experiment with adding more descriptive detail to his paintings, but he was dissatisfied with the result. This artistic problem, and a crisis of his loss of religious faith, left him mentally and physically enervated.

On October 7, 1960, he attempted suicide by driving his car off a mountain road in the French Alps near the Swiss border. Exactly one year later, he returned to the same spot at the same hour and drove off the same road, killing himself.

== Legacy ==
Barnabè's situation as a mid-20th-century artist who did not belong to any movement has been compared to that of Nicolas de Staël and Alberto Giacometti. His work has been cited as inspiration for geometric designs by fashion designers Marie-Christine Statz and Josep Font.
