= Norman Blamey =

English painter

Norman Charles Blamey OBE RA (16 December 1914 – 17 January 2000) was an English painter, noted latterly for his portraits and depictions of Church ritual.

== Life ==
Blamey was educated at Holloway School, London, and then at the Regent Street Polytechnic School of Art (1931–1937). He went on to teach at the Polytechnic – interrupted by military service during World War II – moving to the Chelsea School of Art (now the Chelsea College of Art and Design) in 1963. He exhibited regularly at the Royal Academy, and became an Associate in 1970 and an Academician in 1975; from then on he was a Visiting Lecturer at the Academy Schools, also teaching at The Prince of Wales's Institute of Architecture in the early 1990s. In 1948 he married one of his students, Margaret Kelly, and in 1950 had a son, the philosopher and logician Stephen Blamey. In 1998 he was awarded the OBE.

== Work ==
Blamey's style, though varying slightly at different periods, was generally a meticulous realism. He was influenced by Stanley Spencer (1891–1959), as well as by 15th-century Flemish art. The latter part of his career was marked by a series of portrait commissions, and his work can be seen in the Halls of a number of Colleges of the University of Oxford. Blamey's frequent depiction of the rituals of the Mass reflect his long connection with St Pancras Old Church, where he was an altar server.
