= Henri Gaudier-Brzeska =

French painter and sculptor

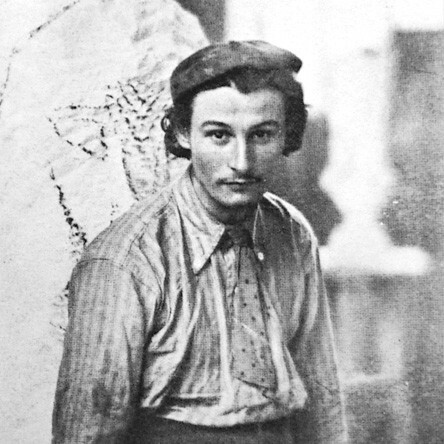
- Born: Henri Gaudier; 4 October 1891; Saint-Jean-de-Braye, near Orléans, France
- Died: 5 June 1915 (aged 23); Neuville-Saint-Vaast, France
- Known for: Sculpture; Painting; Drawing
- Movement: Vorticism

Henri Gaudier-Brzeska (né Gaudier; 4 October 1891 – 5 June 1915) was a French artist and sculptor who developed a rough-hewn, primitive style of direct carving.

== Biography ==
Henri Gaudier was born in Saint-Jean-de-Braye near Orléans. In 1910, he moved to London to become an artist, even though he had no formal training. With him came Sophie Brzeska, a Polish writer 19 years his senior with whom he had met at the Bibliothèque Sainte-Geneviève in Paris, and with whom he began an intense relationship, annexing her surname, even though they never married. During this time his conflicting attitudes towards art are exemplified in what he wrote to Dr. Uhlmayr, with whom he had lived the previous year:

"When I face the beauty of nature, I am no longer sensitive to art, but in the town I appreciate its myriad benefits—the more I go into the woods and the fields the more distrustful I become of art and wish all civilization to the devil; the more I wander about amidst filth and sweat the better I understand art and love it; the desire for it becomes my crying need."

He resolved these reservations by taking up sculpture, having been inspired by his carpenter father. Once in England Gaudier-Brzeska fell in with the Vorticism movement of Ezra Pound and Wyndham Lewis, becoming a founding member of the London Group. After coming under the influence of Jacob Epstein in 1912, he began to believe that sculpture should leave behind the highly finished, polished style of ancient Greece and embrace a more earthy direct carving, in which the tool marks are left visible on the final work as a fingerprint of the artist. Abandoning his early fascination for Auguste Rodin, he began to study instead extra-European artworks located in the British Museum and the Victoria and Albert Museum. As he was unable to afford the raw materials necessary to attempt projects on the scale of Epstein's Indian and Assyrian influenced pieces, he concentrated initially on miniaturist sculpture genres such as Japanese netsuke before developing an interest in work from West Africa and the Pacific Islands.

In 1913, he assisted with the illustrations of Haldane MacFall's book The Splendid Wayfaring along with Claud Lovat Fraser and Edward Gordon Craig. In 1913 Henri Gaudier-Brzeska met young Jewish Alfred Wolmark, and modelled a bronze bust of him; the two remained close friends.

Gaudier-Brzeska's drawing style was influenced by the Chinese calligraphy and poetry which he discovered at the "Ezuversity", Ezra Pound's unofficial locus of teaching. Pound's interaction with Ernest Fenollosa's work on the Chinese brought the young sculptor to the galleries of Eastern art, where he studied the ideogram and applied it to his art. Gaudier-Brzeska had the ability to imply, with a few deft strokes, the being of a subject. His drawings also show the influence of Cubism.

At the start of the First World War, Gaudier-Brzeska enlisted with the French army. He appears to have fought with little regard for his own safety, receiving a decoration for bravery before being killed in the trenches at Neuville-St.-Vaast. During his time in the army, he sculpted a figure out of the butt of a rifle taken from a German soldier, "to express a gentler order of feeling". He was killed in action during the war.

=== Relationship with Sophie Brzeska ===
As a gesture of affection, Gaudier adopted the name of Sophie Brzeska, with whom he had a relationship, the character of which is not certain. They met at the Sainte-Geneviève Library in 1910. He was 18 at the time; she was 38. According to art collector and historian H.S. Ede, "Many were the delicious moments which they passed together, he with his head on her shoulder or she resting on his; the solace of kisses was not allowed, but their spirits were united in a radiant joy. They had their own troubles to talk about, and they discovered that they were both suffering from the same ills."

== Legacy ==
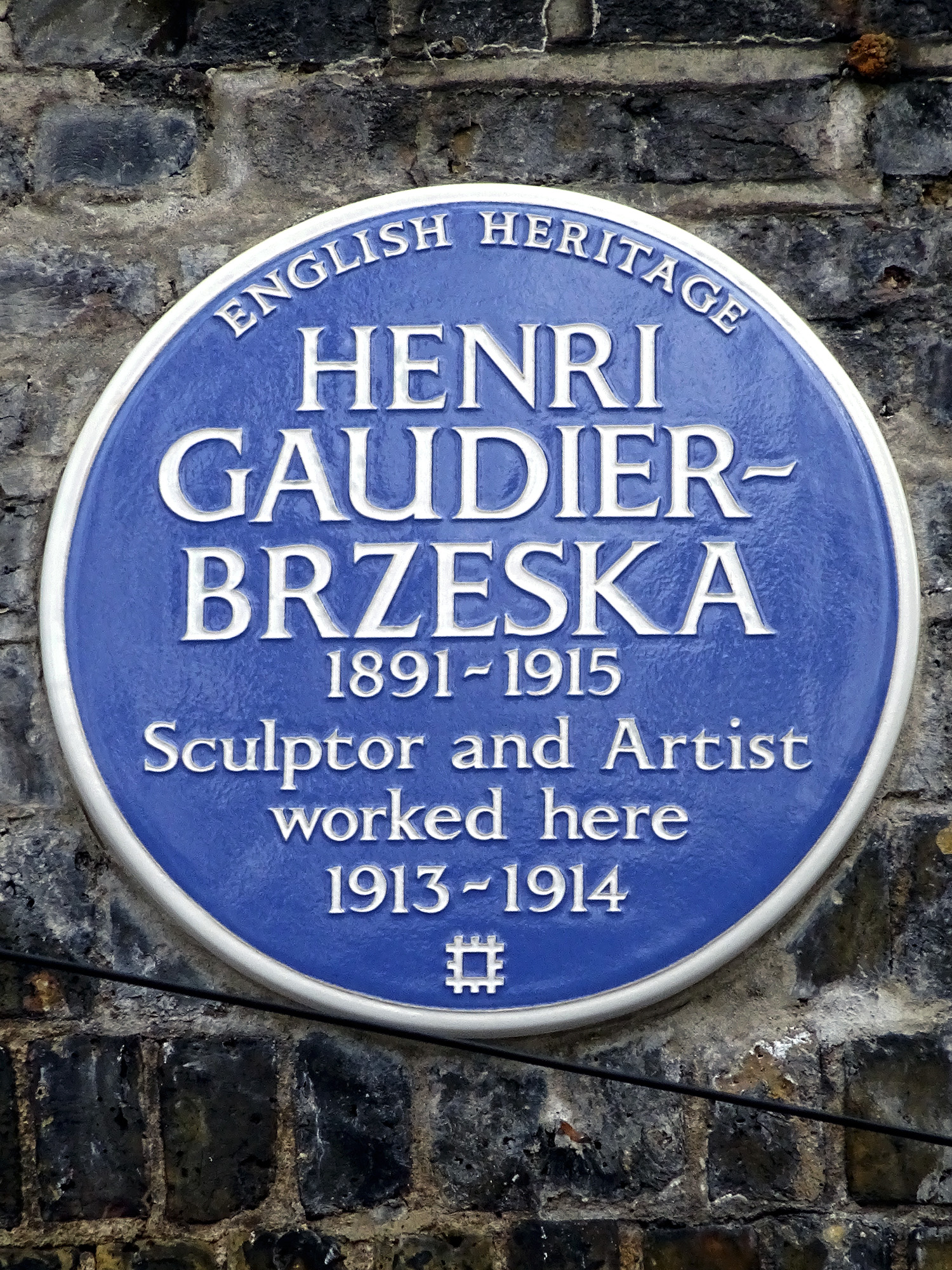
Gaudier-Brzeska's blue plaque on Winthorpe Road

Jim Ede bought a sizeable portion of Gaudier-Brzeska's work from Sophie Brzeska's estate after she died intestate. Her estate included numerous letters sent between Henri and Sophie. Ede used these as the basis for his book Savage Messiah on the life and work of Gaudier-Brzeska, which in turn became the basis of Ken Russell's film of the same name. The conclusion of the film shows many of his sculptures and demonstrates the greatness of the art he produced in his short lifetime.

Despite the fact that he had only four years to develop his art, Gaudier-Brzeska has had a surprisingly strong influence on 20th-century modernist sculpture in England and France. His work is in the permanent collections at the Tate Gallery, Kettle's Yard, the Princeton University Art Museum, the Harvard Art Museums, the University of Michigan Museum of Art, the Museum of Modern Art, the Philadelphia Museum of Art, the Victoria and Albert Museum, the Museum of Fine Arts, Budapest, the Fine Arts Museums of San Francisco, the Metropolitan Museum of Art, the Huntington Library, the Museum of Fine Arts, Boston, the Musée National d'Art Moderne in Paris, and the Musée des Beaux-Arts d'Orléans, among others.

The Nasher Museum of Art at Duke University held an exhibition entitled The Vorticists: Rebel Artists in London and New York, 1914–18 from 30 September 2010 through 2 January 2011, which included his work.

The relationship between Henri Gaudier and Sophie Brzeska was fictionalised in the stage play The Laughing Woman.

== Gallery ==
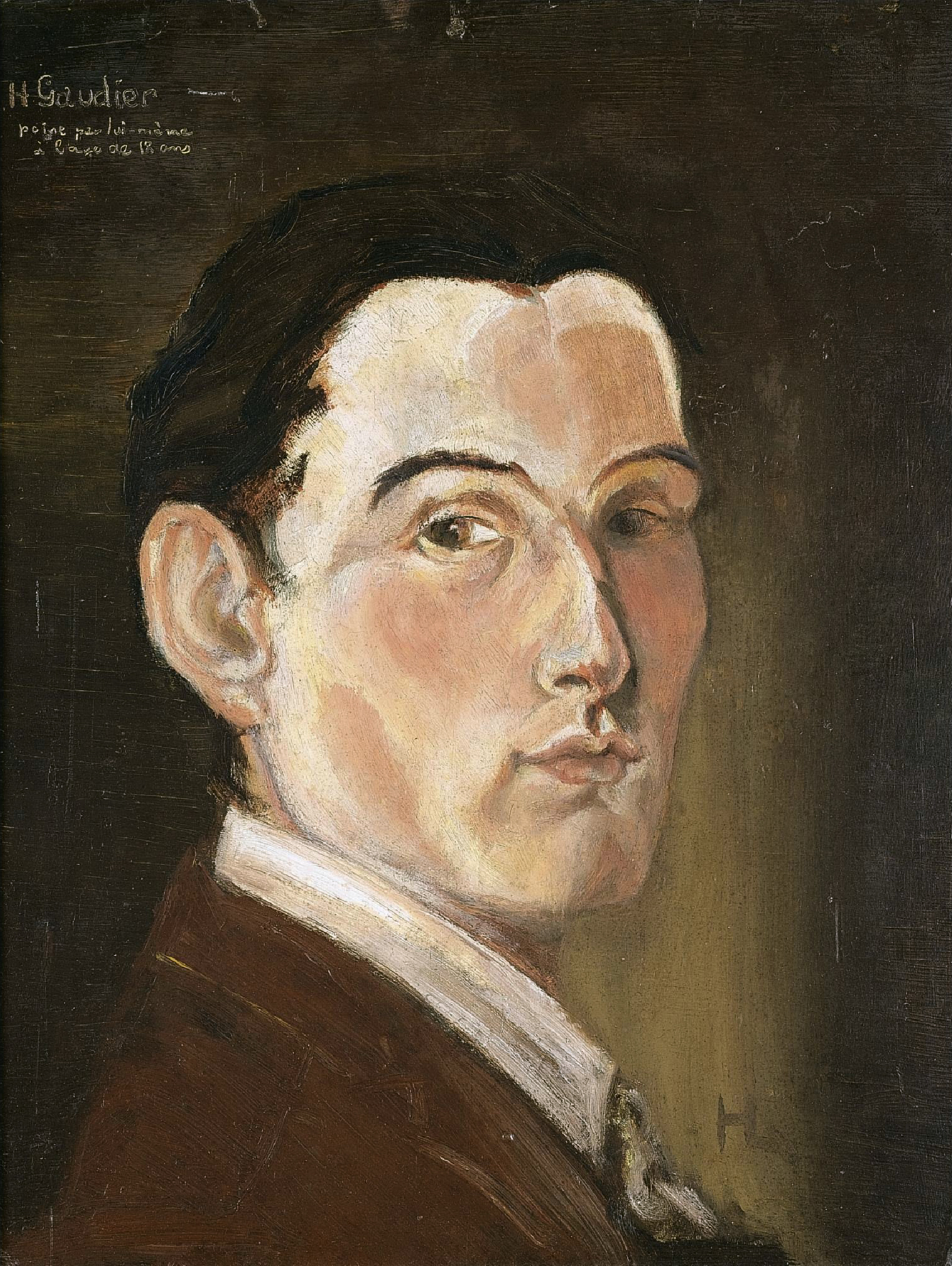
Self-portrait, 1909.

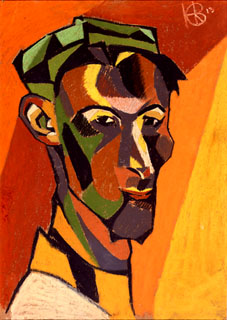
Self-portrait, 1913

Henri Gaudier-Brzeska, 1914, Boy with a Coney (Boy with a rabbit), marble.

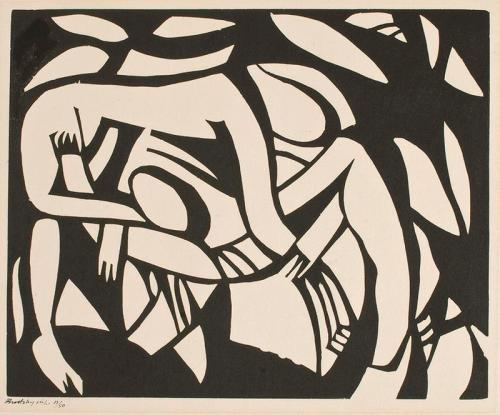
The Wrestlers, Aberdeen Art Gallery.

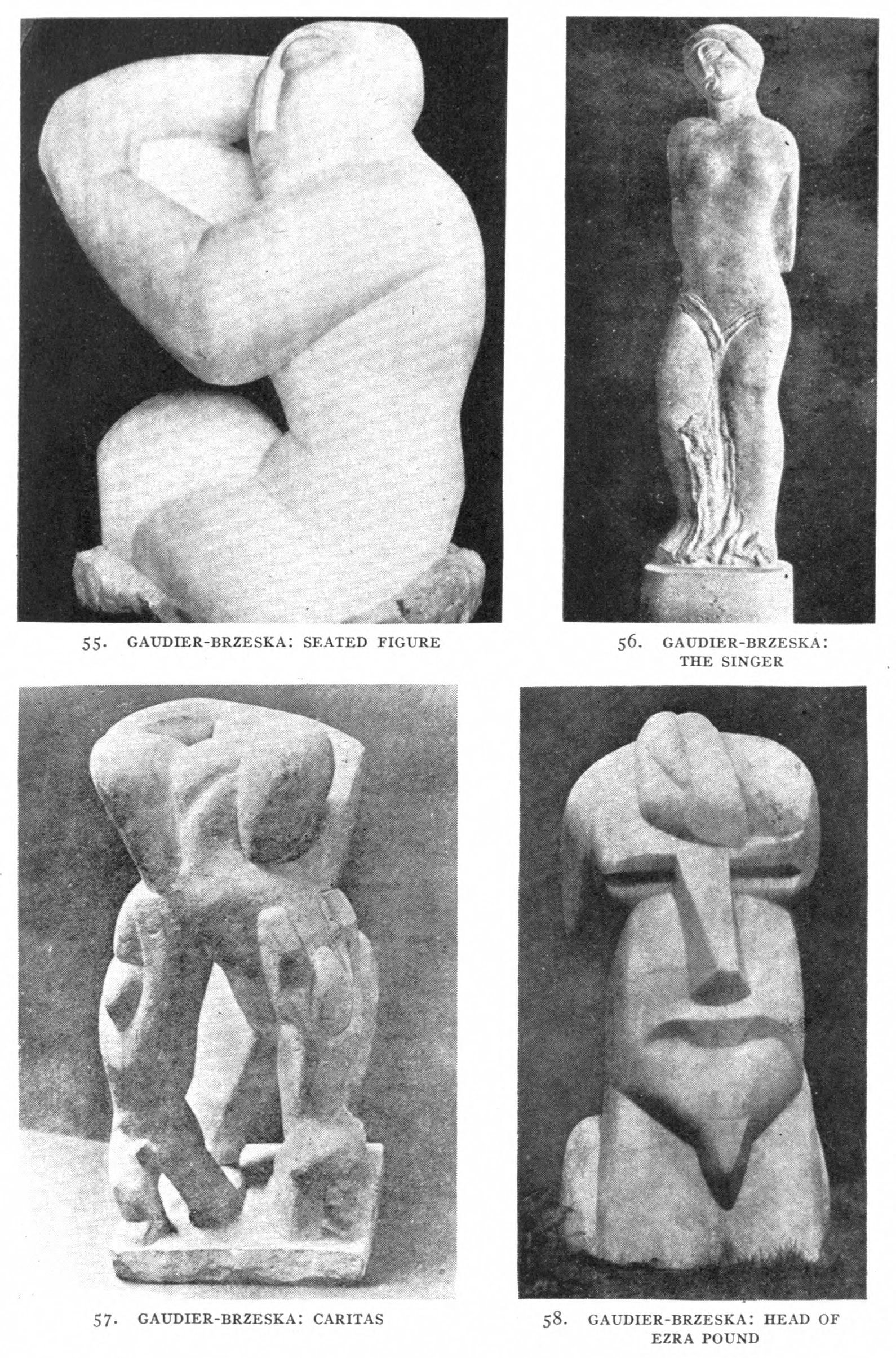
Seated Figure, The Singer, Caritas, Head of Ezra Pound.
