= Portrait of a German Officer =

1914 painting by Marsden Hartley

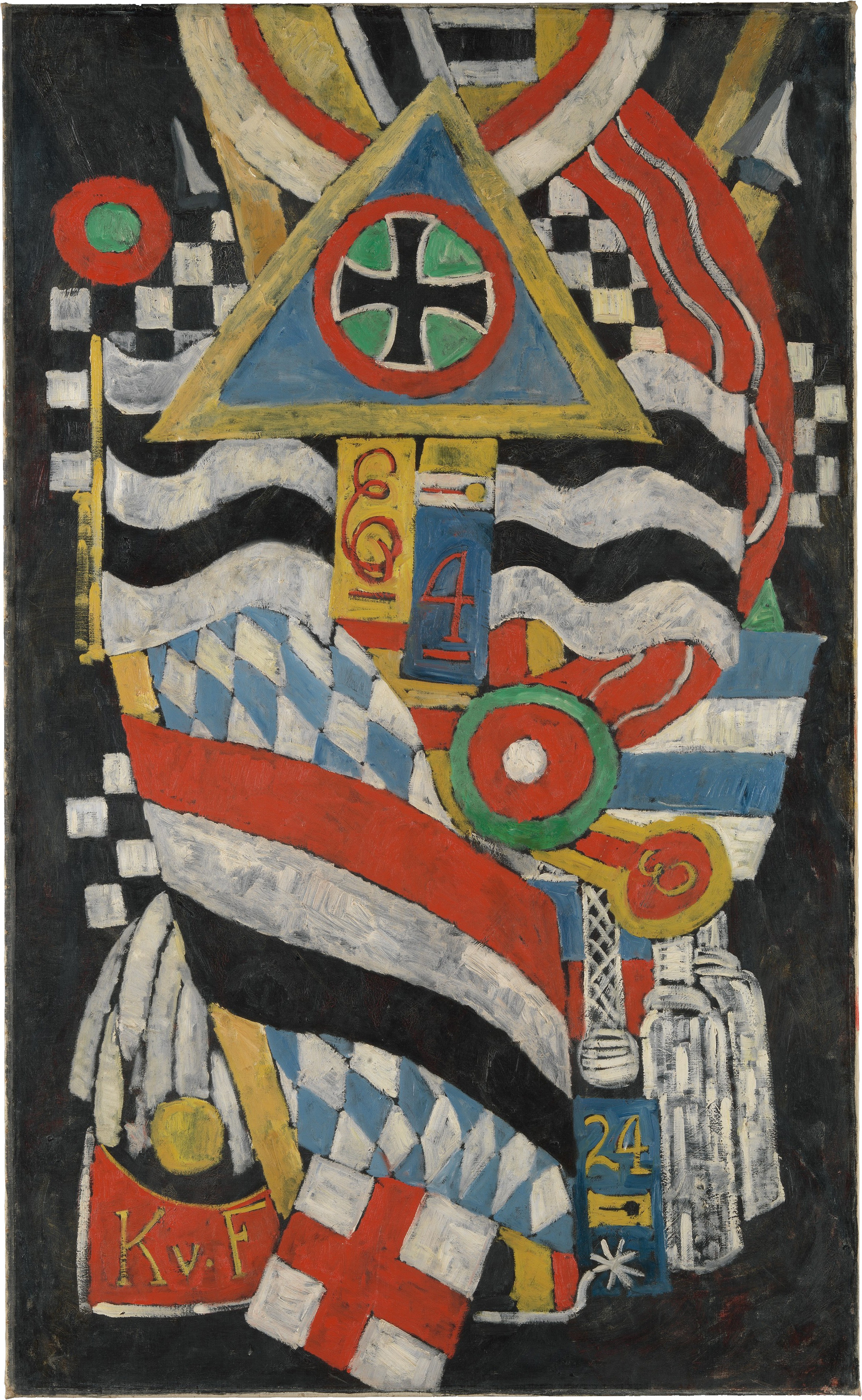
- Artist: Marsden Hartley
- Year: 1914
- Medium: Oil on canvas
- Dimensions: 173.4 cm × 105.1 cm (68.3 in × 41.4 in)
- Location: Metropolitan Museum of Art; New York

Portrait of a German Officer is an early 20th century portrait by American modernist painter Marsden Hartley. Done in oil on canvas, the portrait depicts the abstract figure of an Imperial German officer as being composed entirely of military decorations and badges of rank. The painting is currently on display at the Metropolitan Museum of Art.

== Description ==
=== Background ===
Portrait of a German Officer was painted by American painter Marsden Hartley in late 1914 while he was living in the German imperial capital of Berlin. While in Germany, Hartley was greatly affected by the pageantry and discipline of the German army, with this interest eventually manifesting itself in some of his works. Portrait of a German Officer was intended to honor Karl von Freyburg, a German lieutenant who had died during the first few months of the First World War. It has been posited that Hartley's correspondence with Freyburg indicates that the former was romantically interested in the German officer.

=== Painting ===
Hartley's painting is highly sequential, symbolic, and heavily influenced by cubism and the school of German expressionism. The black, white, and red flag of the German Empire is placed in a prominent position in the bottom central portion of the image, while the Iron Cross (a decoration which Freyburg was awarded) is prominently featured in the top-center. The blue and white checkered flag of Freyburg's home state of Bavaria is also shown, as is an officer's white-striped epaulet. Hartley also included more personal details in the portrait; the number 24 represents Freyburg's age when he died, Freyburg's initials (K.v.F) are seen in gold-on-red, Freyburg's regimental number (4) can be seen in center of the portrait, and a spur (representing Freyburg's service as a cavalry officer) can be seen in the bottom right of the image. Hartley also represented Germany's enemies during the war through his inclusion of the English Cross of St. George and the Belgian Tricolor, both seen at the bottom of the portrait.
