= Matthew Sturgis =

British historian and biographer

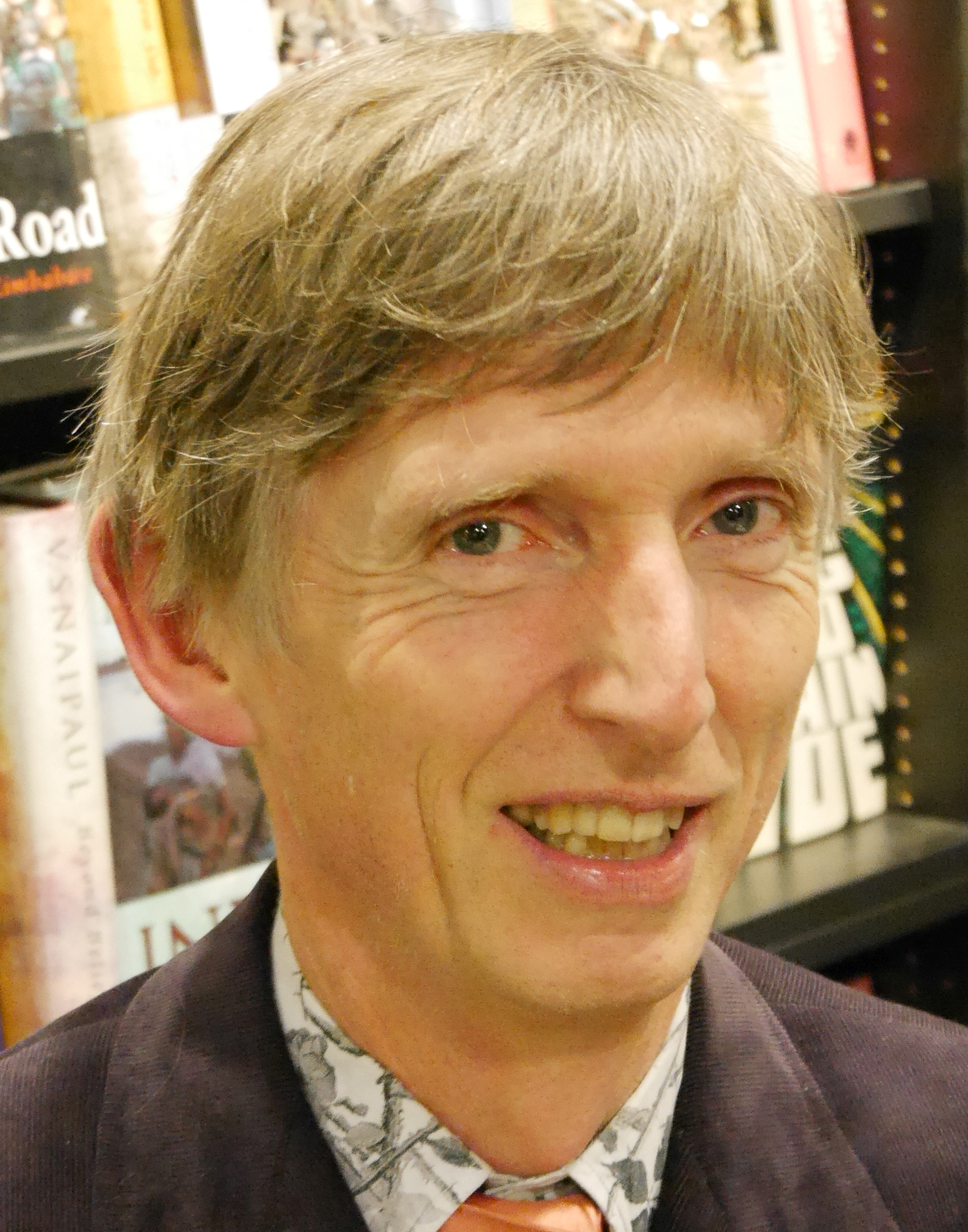
Matthew Sturgis, Hatchards, London, November 2018

Matthew Sturgis (born 1960) is a British historian and biographer.

== Early life ==
Sturgis earned a degree in history at the University of Oxford.

== Career ==
Sturgis has written art criticism for Harpers & Queen, travel journalism for The Sunday Telegraph, book reviews for The Independent, and cartoons for the Oldie and the Daily Mail.

The Independent called his 1998 Aubrey Beardsley: A Biography "impressively researched".

Reviewing Walter Sickert: A Life, Sickert scholar Richard Shone concluded, "At last Sickert has the biography he deserves". Another reviewer found Sturgis "marvelous in capturing the sparkling eccentricities of his subject along with the changing fads and fashions to which Sickert was throughout his long life so sensitive".

Reviewing Oscar: A Life in The Guardian, Anthony Quinn wrote "he is a tremendous orchestrator of material, fastidious, unhurried, indefatigable." The Evening Standard, called it "sympathetic and insightful", and "much better" than the last major biography of Wilde, by Richard Ellman thirty years earlier.

== Personal life ==
He is married to the art dealer and gallerist Rebecca Hossack, and they live in a Georgian house in Fitzrovia, London.

== Publications ==
- 1992 and All This, Macmillan, 1991
- Passionate Attitudes: The English Decadence of the 1890s, Macmillan, 1995
- Aubrey Beardsley: A Biography, 1998
- 1900 House: Featuring Extracts from the Personal Diaries of Joyce and Paul Bowler and Their Family with Mark McCrum, Macmillan, London, 1999. ISBN 978-0-7522-1711-6
- Walter Sickert: A Life, 2005
- Oscar: A Life, Head of Zeus, 2018. Published in the U.S. as Oscar Wilde: A Life, Alfred A. Knopf, 2021.
