= Portrait of a Killer =

2002 book by Patricia Cornwell

- First edition (publ. G. P. Putnam's Sons)
- Author: Patricia Cornwell
- Publication date: 2002
- ISBN: 0-425-19273-3

Portrait of a Killer: Jack the Ripper—Case Closed (ISBN 0-425-19273-3) is a 2002 non-fiction book by crime novelist Patricia Cornwell that presents the theory that Walter Sickert, a German-British painter, was the 19th-century serial killer known as Jack the Ripper.

Jean Overton Fuller, in her 1990 book Sickert and the Ripper Crimes, had maintained that Sickert was Jack the Ripper. Prior to that, Stephen Knight, in his 1976 book Jack the Ripper: The Final Solution, had maintained that Sickert had been forced to be an accomplice of the Ripper. Neither of these two books is mentioned in Cornwell's book.

Cornwell's book was released to much controversy, especially within the British art world, where Sickert's work is admired, and also among "Ripperologists", who dispute her research methods and conclusions. Cornwell lashed back at these critics, claiming that, if she were a man or British, her theory would have been accepted. She has also made remarks indicating that those who study the Ripper case would rather have the mystery than its solution.

== Theory ==
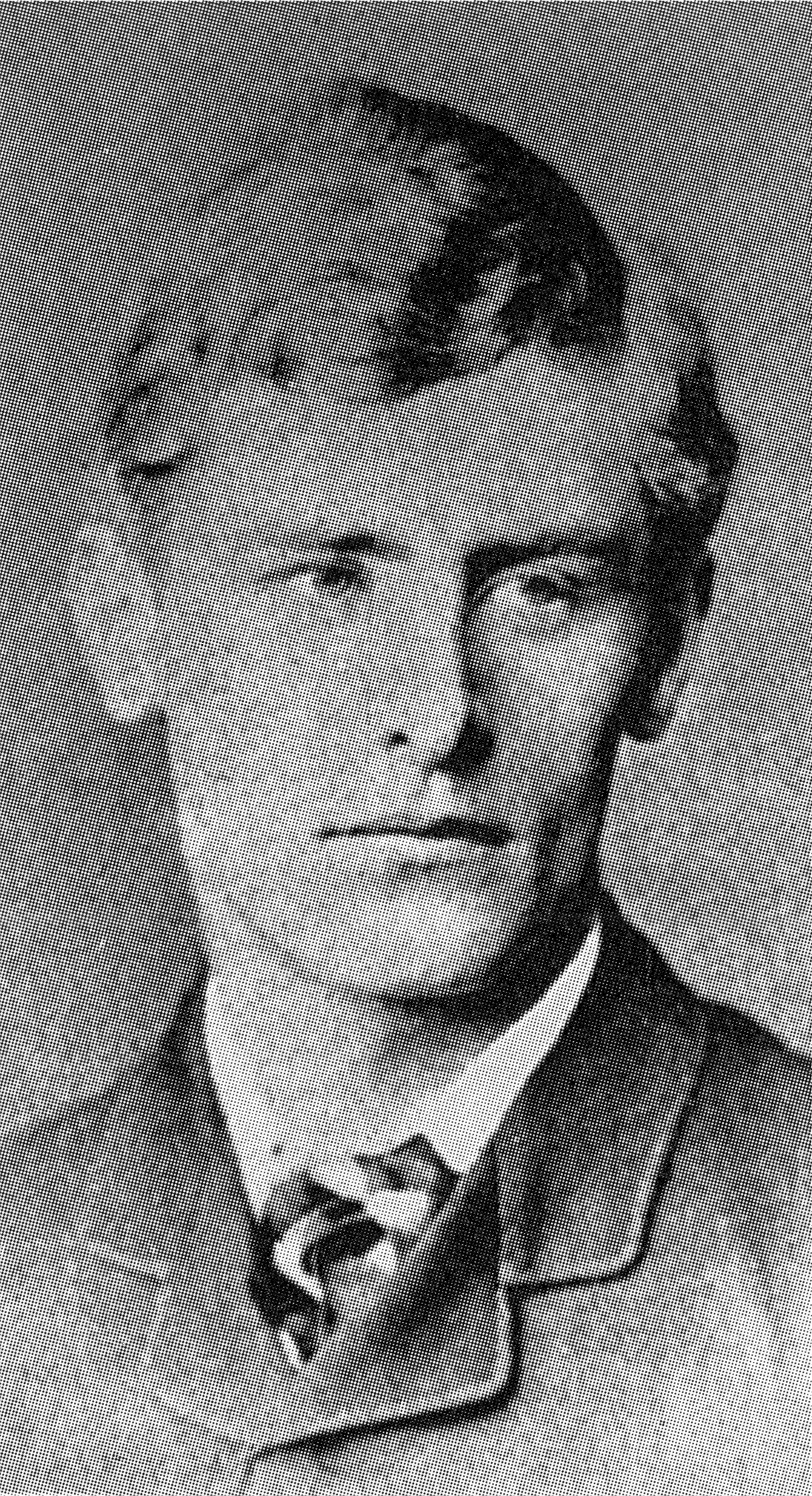
Walter Sickert, circa 1884, a few years prior to his alleged involvement in the Ripper murders

Cornwell contends Sickert had the psychological profile of a killer. She asserts that many of his paintings and sketches follow a violently misogynistic theme. Cornwell's belief is that Sickert was unable to have normal intercourse because of botched surgery to correct a fistula on his penis. However, Cornwell provides little evidence for either the fistula or the surgery. The killings coincide with the marriage of Sickert's close friend and mentor, the famous painter James Abbott McNeill Whistler, who later distanced himself from Sickert, even suing Sickert later in life. Cornwell claims this marriage and the end of the friendship provided the spark which exacerbated his awareness of his disabilities and ignited a latent anger against the opposite sex.

Departing from common belief among experts that most of the Ripper's letters were hoaxes, Cornwell writes that the letters contain specific information related to crimes, and as such are unlikely to be from anyone other than the Ripper. However, Cornwell's book does not discuss exactly which details of the Ripper's murders were made known to the general public at the time. Cornwell cites Sickert's artistic genius as useful for crafting the Ripper's letters by disguising handwriting and varying sketching styles. She also points to Sickert's paintings and sketches, some of which show women in prostrate poses that Cornwell claims are similar to victims at their crime scenes.

Cornwell also had a stamp licked by the writer of one of the supposed Ripper letters analysed for DNA, and claimed it pointed to Sickert. However, the analysis could only be of mitochondrial DNA, and the result could be shared by anything from between 1 percent and 10 percent of the population. Sickert was, at best, "not excluded" by the analysis, but his typically European result would be shared by large groups of Britons alive in 1888.

Cornwell has said, including in her Desert Island Discs interview with Sue Lawley, that new evidence has come to light since 2002. She states that a paper manufacture expert she hired asserts that reams of paper supposedly used by Jack the Ripper to write several letters to Scotland Yard and paper purchased by Sickert's mother bear the same small-press watermark. She also claims that there are matches in the cutter's marks, which are a result of the rough cutting of each quire (or small package) for packaging. A "quire" was usually of 24 sheets.

== Responses from critics ==
Though Cornwell's book sold many copies, many Ripperologists and other critics argued that Cornwell's theory was far from persuasive.

- Critics point out that most, if not all, of the Ripper letters are considered hoaxes by other authorities and that if they really are hoaxes, then Sickert may have been one of the hoaxers. Thus, even if he did write one or more of these letters, that does not prove that he was the Ripper.
- The evidence she claims supports the idea that Sickert had a disfigured penis also supports the more accepted theory that he had a fistula in his anus.
- Details in the letters and supposedly seen in the paintings she claims only the killer would know had previously been published in newspapers and a book released in France. Sickert could have easily got hold of the book in question, as he also lived in France off and on. In fact, evidence shows that he was probably in France on the nights of four of the five Ripper murders.

Critics also note that Cornwell has said that she did not have a theory about the murders until about a year before her book was published and believed that the first suspect mentioned to her was the one who really committed the crimes.

In September 2014, Finnish molecular biologist Jari Louhelainen claimed that his DNA analysis pointed to a different suspect, Aaron Kosminski, which also provoked criticism and controversy.

The New York Times's December 2002 review by Caleb Carr was very critical, writing:

Portrait of a Killer is a sloppy book, insulting to both its target and its audience. The only way for Cornwell to repair its damage will be to stay with this case, as she says she intends to, continuing her research, studies and tests for the years required to complete them thoroughly. Perhaps then she can then do what she claims to have done already—prove Walter Sickert's guilt decisively. Failing that, she should apologize for this exercise in calumny.

== 2017 ==
In 2017, Cornwell published another book on the subject, Ripper: The Secret Life of Walter Sickert, in which she uncovers what she believes to be further evidence for Sickert's guilt.

== See also ==
- Jack the Ripper conspiracy theories
- Walter Sickert
- Jack the Ripper's Bedroom, one of Sickert's paintings
