= Jack the Ripper's Bedroom =

Painting by Walter Sickert

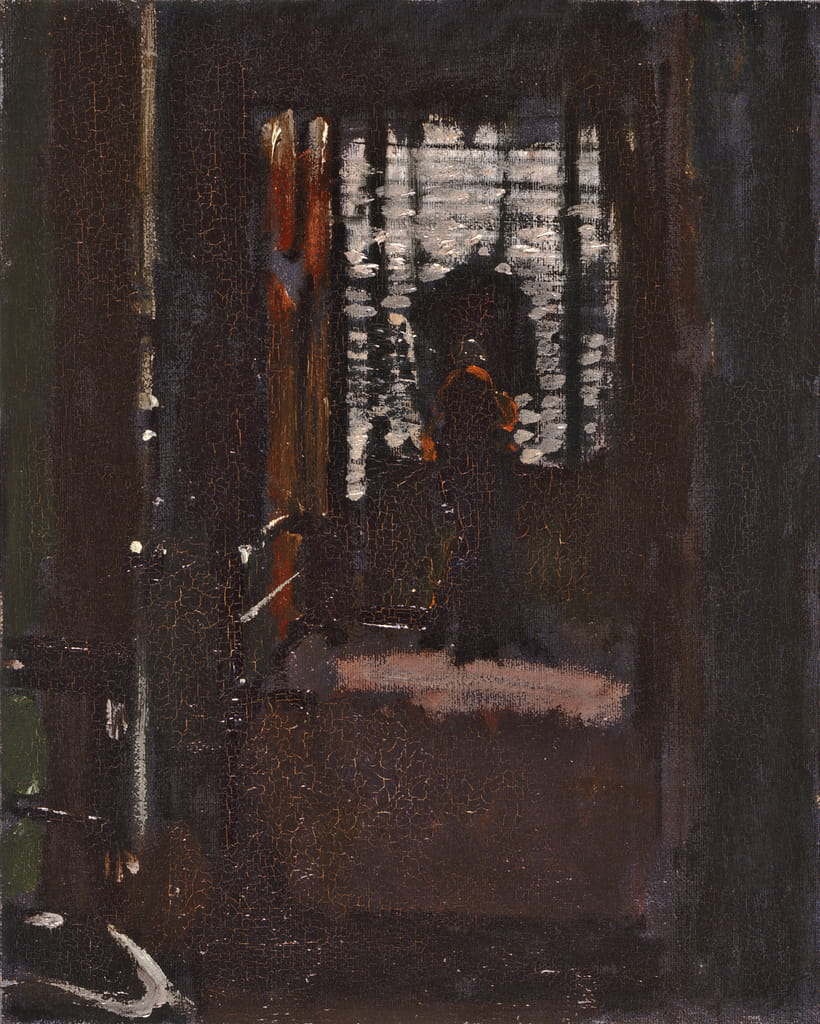
- Artist: Walter Sickert
- Year: c. 1906–1907
- Completion date: 1907
- Medium: Oil on canvas
- Movement: Impressionism
- Subject: The hypothetical bedroom of serial killer Jack the Ripper
- Dimensions: 50.8 cm × 40.7 cm (20.0 in × 16.0 in)
- Location: Manchester Art Gallery, Manchester

Jack the Ripper's Bedroom is an oil on canvas painting by German-born British artist Walter Sickert, painted from c. 1906 to 1907. It depicts a darkly lit bedroom hypothetically owned by Jack the Ripper, the culprit of at least five of London's Whitechapel murders in 1888.

The model bedroom was actually Sickert's own bedroom in his flat at 6 Mornington Crescent in London; the landlady of the flat told Sickert she believed the bedroom had belonged to the Ripper in 1888. Discussion of the piece is tied to controversial theories about Sickert as a possible culprit or associate of the Ripper, which started in the 1970s after the release of Stephen Knight's book Jack the Ripper: The Final Solution. The painting has mostly stayed in the Manchester Art Gallery since 1980.

== Background ==
=== Jack the Ripper ===
Jack the Ripper was the culprit in at least five of the 1888 Whitechapel murders of many women in London. Whitechapel was a "notoriously rough" area at the East End of the city. The five victims tied to the Ripper, all prostitutes, were Mary Ann Nichols, Annie Chapman, Elizabeth Stride, Catherine Eddowes, and Mary Jane Kelly. Jack the Ripper's identity was never discovered. Press coverage of the murders was extensive, and the murders have stayed in the public consciousness since then.

=== Walter Sickert ===
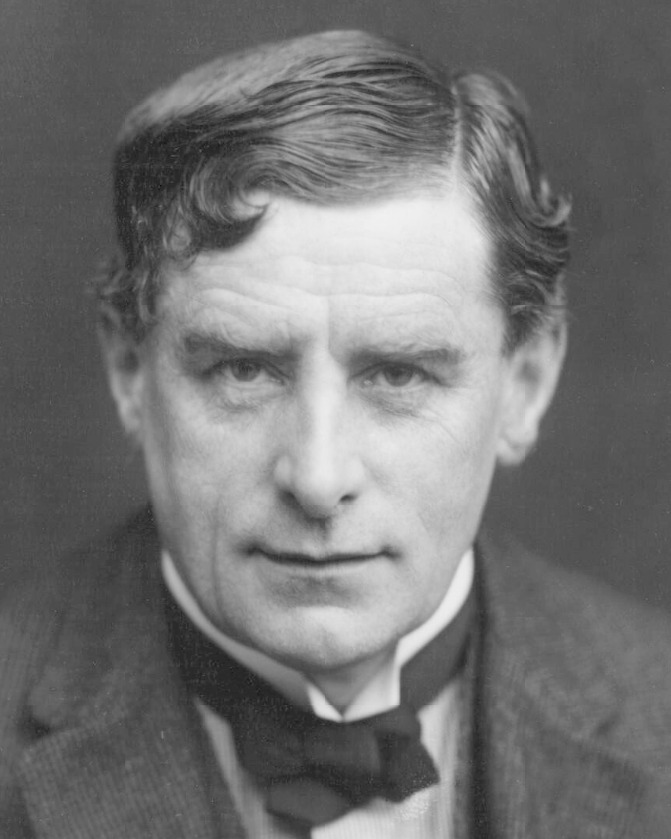
A 1911 portrait of Walter Sickert

Walter Sickert was a German-born British artist. He was fascinated with the Ripper, and his friends said he would dress up as the Ripper. With his paintings, he had an "[underlying] desire to confront taboo social subjects in order to shake the complacency he believed dominated English subject matter". At the time of painting Jack the Ripper's Bedroom, he lived in a flat at 6 Mornington Crescent, Camden Town, North London. Camden Town is about 5 miles from Whitechapel. He moved there in 1905. When Sickert rented the flat, his landlady, Louisa Jones, had told him she suspected the previous tenant, who lived there in 1888, was the Ripper. She said that the tenant had gone out on the nights of the murders, and left once the murders stopped. She told Sickert the name of the tenant, which he wrote in the flyleaf of a book. The book was lent to Albert Rutherson, who lost it. In 1907, Camden Town resident Emily Dimmock had her throat slit in the Camden Town Murder, and Sickert may have connected that murder to the Ripper. He also made four paintings depicting the murder, named The Camden Town Murder.

== Composition ==
Jack the Ripper's Bedroom is an oil on canvas painting, painted from c. 1906 to 1907. In the scene, drawn in an "illegible" style, a darkly lit middle-class bedroom is seen through an open doorway and a hallway. The model for the bedroom was the bedroom of Sickert's flat. There is pink light coming through the horizontal slats of a window's blinds at the back of the room. The furniture, which includes a dressing table and two chairs, is indistinct enough to prevent the viewer from making out certain details. The Manchester Art Gallery's description of the painting says the indistinction makes "it conceivable that there is a person sitting on the [center] chair, but there is no one there." In 6 Mornington Crescent, the doorway to the bedroom's hallway was located at the back of the house, connected to the first-floor front room.

Author Wendy Baron, writing for the Yale University Press, calls the painting "moody" and "sinister", and highlights Sickert's talent for composing melodrama.

== Legacy ==
The painting is cited as an early example of Jack the Ripper in the arts. It was bequeathed by Mars Mary Ciely Tatlock to the Manchester Art Gallery in 1980. In 2002, it was temporarily at the Walker Art Gallery in Liverpool for the exhibition "Sickert: A Life in Art".

=== Theories regarding Sickert being Jack the Ripper ===
The painting has been used as evidence of the controversial theory that Sickert was the culprit or associate of Jack the Ripper. The theory started when Joseph Sickert, Walter's son, told author Stephen Knight that Walter had told him the truth about the murders, and that they were carried about by William Gull, and aided by John Netley and Robert Anderson. Knight's research led him to the theory that Robert Anderson was not a culprit, but rather Sickert. Knight published this theory in his 1976 book, Jack the Ripper: The Final Solution. Joseph Sickert revealed in 1978 that the story supposedly told by Walter was a hoax, but the theory still grew in popularity. The theory was again published in Jean Overton Fuller's 1990 book, Sickert and the Ripper Crimes, and Patricia Cornwell's 2002 book Portrait of a Killer.

Cornwell used Jack the Ripper's Bedroom as evidence of her theory. In 2002, she infamously tore apart one of the Camden Town Murder paintings to retrieve Sickert's DNA. A 2019 article in Science stated that Cornwell's allegation that Sickert was the Ripper was based on a DNA analysis of letters that "many experts believe ... to be fake" and that "another genetic analysis of the letters claimed the murderer could have been a woman".

Author Jennifer Dasal says the art world "by-and-large" has "scoffed at the assertion of Walter Sickert as Jack the Ripper". Baron calls the theory a "fantasy", and says "it is uncertain whether [Jack the Ripper's Bedroom] suggested the Jack the Ripper title to him, or vice versa". She says the theories "pay insufficient heed to the imperatives which motivated Sickert as a painter", and that his business in Camden Town was "of a painter in at a certain stage of technical development". Dasal says it's reminiscent of "those who willingly pay to stay in the Lizzie Borden Bed and Breakfast in Fall River, Massachusetts—the frisson of being connected to a killer, however loose, is a huge draw".

== Works cited. ==
- Baron, Wendy (2006). Sickert: Paintings and Drawings, Yale University Press. ISBN 978-0-300-11129-3.
- Smith, Clare (2016). Jack the Ripper in Film and Culture: Top Hat, Gladstone Bag and Fog, Palgrave Macmillan UK. ISBN 978-1-137-59999-5.
- Dasal, Jennifer (2020). ArtCurious: Stories of the Unexpected, Slightly Odd, and Strangely Wonderful in Art History, Penguin Publishing Group. ISBN 978-0-143-13459-6.
- Young, Thomas W. (2018). The Sherlock Effect: How Forensic Doctors and Investigators Disastrously Reason Like the Great Detective, Taylor & Francis. ISBN 978-1-351-11382-3.
- Wilson, Larry (2012). Criminal Major Case Management: Persons of Interest Priority Assessment Tool, Taylor & Francis. ISBN ISBN 978-1-439-89861-1.
