= Problem picture =

Genre of art popular in late Victorian painting

Trust Me (1860–62), by John Everett Millais, an early example of the problem picture.

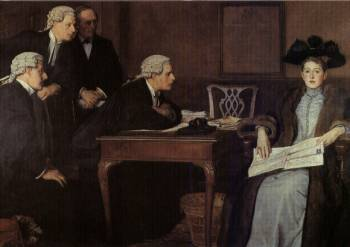
Defendant and Counsel (1895), by William Frederick Yeames, a problem picture which invites the viewer to speculate on the woman's alleged crime and on whether or not she may be guilty.

A problem picture is a genre of art popular in late Victorian painting, characterised by the deliberately ambiguous depiction of a key moment in a narrative that can be interpreted in several different ways, or which portrays an unresolved dilemma. It has some relation to the problem play. The viewer of the picture is invited to speculate about several different possible explanations of the scene. The genre has much in common with that of book illustration, then at its most popular, but with the text belonging to the illustration omitted.

The genre began to emerge in the second half of the nineteenth century, along with the development of book illustrations that depicted "pregnant" moments in a narrative. One of the earliest problem pictures is John Everett Millais' Trust Me, which depicts an older man demanding that a young woman hand him a letter she has received. Either character might be uttering the words. The significance and content of the letter is left to the imagination. Their relationship is also unclear; in view of their ages, they might be a married couple, or a father and daughter.

Other artists who worked in the genre included William Frederick Yeames, whose "And when did you last see your father?" became the most famous example of the genre. It depicts a young boy of the English Civil War period being gently interrogated by Cromwellian troops who are looking for his Royalist father. It is implied that they are asking a trick question designed to discover his location. The painting is poised at the moment the child is about to answer. Yeames painted many other works of this type, including Amy Robsart and Defendant and Counsel. When the latter was exhibited a newspaper ran a competition for readers to guess what crime the woman was accused of.

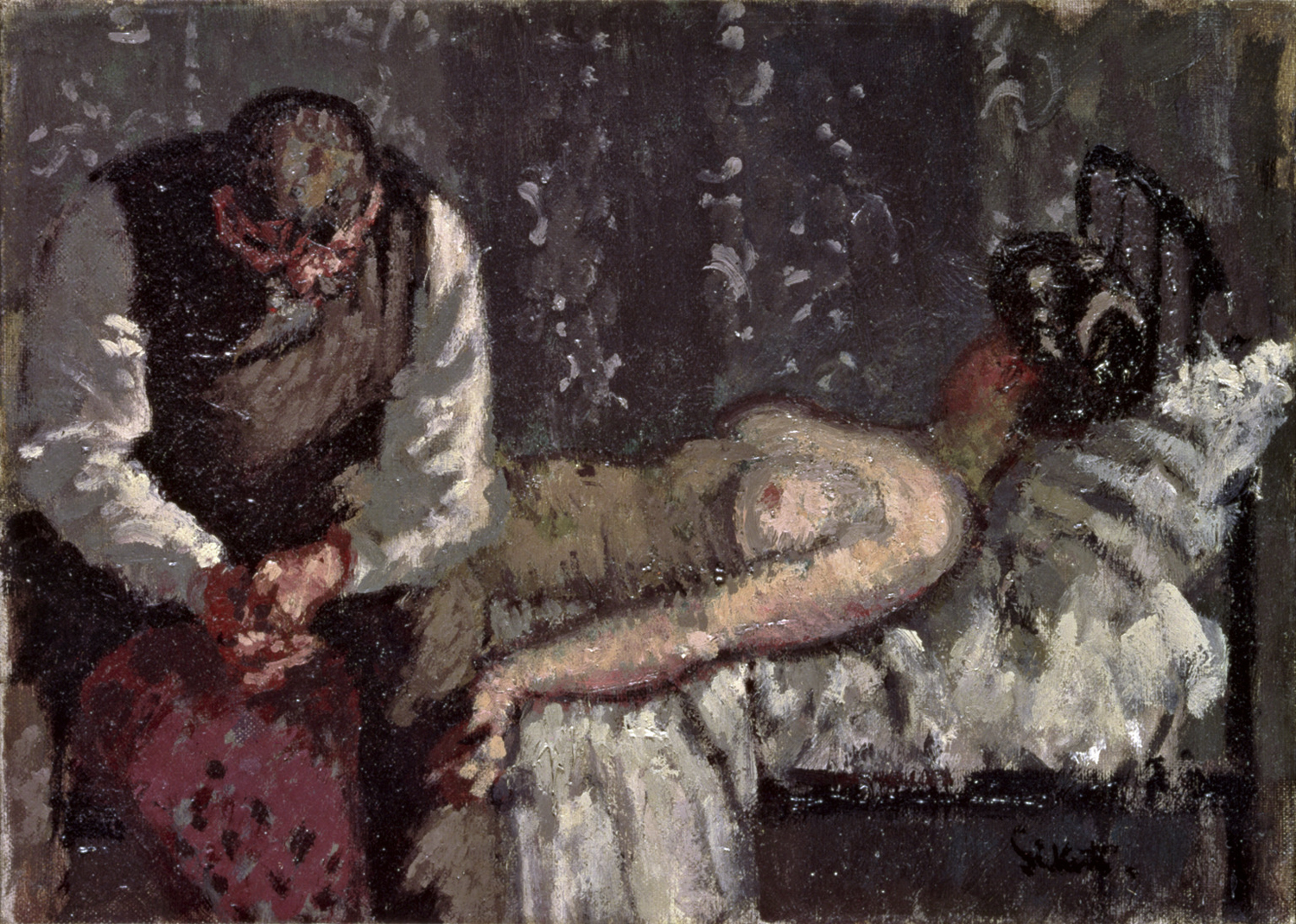
The Camden Town Murder by Walter Sickert, 1908, originally titled, What Shall We Do for the Rent? or What Shall We Do to Pay the Rent

Some avant garde artists also experimented with the genre, notably Edgar Degas and his follower Walter Sickert. Degas's Interior (1869) depicts an ambiguous scene suggestive of sexual transgression and violence (hence the alternative title of "the Rape"). Similar ambiguity is found in Sickert's The Camden Town Murder (1908), in which the two figures can be interpreted as a couple, or a killer and his victim.

In The Prodigal Daughter (1903) by John Collier a flashily dressed young woman returns home to her respectable, elderly parents late in the evening. It is ambiguous whether she has been working as an actress, a prostitute or simply been living a bohemian lifestyle.

The genre continued to be popular into the early twentieth century, but was by this time increasingly seen as old fashioned and as over-literary, against the emphasis on pictorial style and form characteristic of Impressionism and Post-Impressionism.
