= Margaret Parker =

Margaret Parker may refer to:

- Margaret Brynhild Parker (1907–1987), British artist
- Margaret Eleanor Parker (1827–1896), British social activist
- Margaret Parker (archer), British athlete
- Margaret Parker (javelin thrower), Australian athlete
