= Elwin Hawthorne =

English painter

- Born: Elwin Hawthorn; 1905; Poplar, London, England
- Died: 15 October 1954 (age 49)
- Occupation: Painter
- Spouse: Lilian Ann Leahy

Elwin Hawthorne (1905–1954) was a British painter, and part of the so-called East London Group. He was often described as an English Utrillo.

Hawthorne was born Elwin Hawthorn in Poplar, London, in 1905. one of six sons and a daughter, whose father was a painter and decorator. He left school aged 14, without obtaining any qualifications. With no job, he took art courses at Bethnal Green Men's Institute and the Bow & Bromley Evening Institute. He adopted the spelling "Hawthorne" from 1928, having been catalogued as such at an East London Art Club exhibition held at Whitechapel Art Gallery. He subsequently worked, for three years, as assistant to Walter Sickert.

Hawthorne's painting of Kensington Palace (1936), for London Transport advertising

He exhibited regularly at Lefevre Galleries, who paid him a retainer and had first refusal on his works, and hosted two solo exhibitions. He painted a number of buildings in London, including St John-at-Hampstead, and the since-demolished St Andrew's church in Vanbrugh Park. Further afield, his subjects include North Foreland Lighthouse. One of his painting was shown in the British pavilion at the 1936 Venice Biennale.

He served in the army during World War II, which conflict saw the end of his exhibiting. After discharge, he became a wages clerk for Plessey and taught art part-time.

Hawthorne died in the King George Hospital at Ilford, Essex, on 15 October 1954 and was survived by his wife, Lilian (ne Leahy; they married in 1937 and she died in 1996), who was also an East London Group artist, and their two children. By the time of his death, aged 49, he had become so disenchanted with the art world that he had used one of his paintings, on board, as a shelf in a coal bunker. It was later recovered by his wife. HIs estate at probate was worth £1442 8s.

The author David Buckman has described him as:

a prominent talent in the [East London] Group and an integral part of the lost history of one of the major artistic movements to come out of the East End in the last century.

A number of Hawthorne's works are in public collections in the United Kingdom, including Manchester Art Gallery, the Laing Art Gallery, Ulster Museum, St. Anne's College (University of Oxford), Russell-Cotes Art Gallery & Museum, Aberdeen Art Gallery & Museums, Herbert Art Gallery & Museum, Camden Local Studies and Archives Centre, and the Harris Museum & Art Gallery.
