= Trust Me (Millais painting) =

Painting by John Everett Millais

- Artist: John Everett Millais
- Year: 1860–62
- Type: Oil painting
- Location: Private collection

Trust Me is an 1860–62 oil painting by the English artist John Everett Millais. It shows a young woman holding a letter behind her back facing an older man who has his hand out to her, as if to ask for or receive the letter.

== The painting ==
Millais commenced work on Trust Me, together with his painting The Ransom, in the autumn of 1860.

The painting is of a genre of Victorian painting that came to be known as a problem picture, characterised by the deliberately ambiguous depiction of a key moment in a narrative that can be interpreted in several different ways, or which portrays an unresolved dilemma:

[Trust Me] shows a moment's interaction between a well-dressed woman and an older man, who is in hunting pink and holding a riding-crop. She is holding what appears to be a letter behind her back, while he is holding out his hand as to receive it. One character is saying to the other 'Trust me', yet it is not apparent who is speaking. Is the man saying that he can be trusted to read the letter, or is the woman saying that he can be confident that she has nothing to hide from him? We have no idea what their relationship might be, older husband and younger wife, or father and daughter, legal guardian and ward - the possibilities are numerous.

The painting hung in the Royal Academy Exhibition of 1862, catalogue number 269, along with Millais' The Ransom.

The painting was owned by American businessman Malcolm Forbes, and was due to be sold in a posthumous auction by Christie's of his art collection in spring 2003. However, it did not appear in Christie's "The Forbes Collection of Victorian Pictures and Works of Art" auction of 19-20 February 2003, so presumably had been sold privately before this. The painting's current owner and location is not in public record.

== See also ==
- List of paintings by John Everett Millais
