= Christine Angus =

British illustrator and embroiderer

Christine Drummond Angus (6 June 1877 – 13 October 1920) was a British illustrator and embroiderer. She made several pieces for the furniture designer Ambrose Heal and her designs were often figurative and included illustrations of children. She was married to the painter Walter Sickert from 1911 until her death in 1920.

== Life and career ==
Angus was born on 6 June 1877, the daughter of Adrina Agnes Drummond and John Henry Angus, a Scottish leather merchant. The family moved to London in around 1900 and at the 1901 census, Christine was lodging in Torquay and working as an artist with an aunt as her chaperone.

She designed parts of furniture for Ambrose Heal including the inlay work on Joan's Chair, a high chair made in 1901 for Angus' niece. The chair is now recognised as an important piece in the Arts and Crafts movement. Heal also bought a piece of Angus' embroidery work which he framed into a tray.

In 1907, she studied drawing at the Slade School of Fine Art (part of what is now University College London) while living at home in Porchester Terrace. She was friends with Edith Todhunter at art school who went on to marry Heal; Angus remained close with the family and produced several designs for Heal & Sons. In 1916, Angus designed a dalmatic which was used in a children's service at Westminster Abbey and later shown at the 1916 Exhibition.

In early July 1911, the painter Walter Sickert had been jilted at the altar by his fiancée, one of his young art students. He quickly turned his attention to Angus, whom he overwhelmed with correspondence until she became ill and was sent to Chagford, Devon by her family to recuperate. Sickert followed her to Devon and persuaded her to marry him. Angus married Sickert on 29 July 1911 at Paddington Registry Office. They had their honeymoon at Neuville and afterwards lived in Harrington Square, Camden Town.

Angus was sickly and suffered from neuritis and chilblains, and according to Patricia Cornwell, Sickert found her ill health inconvenient. She died in October 1920 from tuberculosis.
