= Florence Pash =

British portraitist and model (1862-1951)

Florence Pash Humphrey Holland
- Portrait of Florence Pash, 1897 by Walter Sickert
- Born: Florence Pash; 1862; London, United Kingdom
- Died: 1951 (aged 88–89)
- Known for: Painting
- Spouses: Albert Alexander Humphrey (m. 1898–1917) C. T. Holland (m. 1923–1927)

Florence Pash Humphrey Holland (1862–1951) was a British portrait painter. She is known for running an art school with Walter Sickert in the mid-1890s.

== Biography ==
Pash was born in London in 1862. She exhibited at the Royal Society of British Artists, the Paris Salon and the Royal Academy of Arts. Pash exhibited her work at the Palace of Fine Arts at the 1893 World's Columbian Exposition in Chicago, Illinois.

She ran a private art school in Sloane Street with the help of Walter Sickert.

She was a portraitist and was also the model for several notable artist including Sickert, Charles Conder, E. J. Sullivan, and Jacques-Émile Blanche.

She married Albert Alexander Humphrey in 1898 and was widowed in 1917. In 1923, she married C. T. Holland She signed her works Florence Pash, Mrs Florence P. Humphrey and Mrs A. A. Humphrey.

Pash died on 25 June 1951.
