= David Robins =

David Nathan Robins (17 November 1944 – 6 October 2007) was a British journalist, author, and sociologist who was closely associated with the 1960s and 70s counter-culture. Later he became involved in youth work and write several books on youth culture in Britain.

== Early life and family ==
Robins was born on 17 November 1944. He was brought up in Willesden, north London. His father was a former boxer turned barber. His mother was a communist. He was educated at Kilburn grammar school and then studied English at University College London. He married the Canadian art historian Anna Gruetzner Robins.

== 1960s counter-culture ==
In the mid-1960s, through a chance meeting with Barry Miles, Robins became an editor at the underground newspaper IT. He participated in the 1968 student rebellion in Paris and then became enthused with the situationists in London.

== Youth work ==
In the 1970s, Robins became concerned that disaffected young people were moving towards far right causes and began to take a serious interest in them, beginning to write books on the subject and in the 1980s working with The Prince's Trust.

== Death ==
Robins died on 6 October 2007 and his ashes were interred on the eastern side of Highgate Cemetery on 22nd July 2009. He was survived by his wife and his two children Daniel and Sophie.

== Selected publications ==
- Knuckle sandwich: Growing up in the working class city. Penguin, Harmondsworth, 1978. (with Philip Cohen) ISBN 9780140219777
- We hate humans. Penguin, Harmondsworth, 1984. ISBN 9780140070620
- Just punishment. Gloucester Press, London, 1990. ISBN 9780531172520
- Sport as prevention: The role of sport in crime prevention programmes aimed at young people: A report. Centre for Criminological Research, University of Oxford, Oxford, 1990. ISBN 9780947811037
- Tarnished vision: Crime and conflict in the inner city. Oxford University Press, Oxford, 1992. ISBN 9780198257516
- Cool rules: Anatomy of an attitude. Reaktion Books, 2000. (With Dick Pountain) ISBN 978-1861890719
