= Brynhild Parker =

British painter (1907–1987)

- Born: 1907
- Died: 1987 (aged 79–80)
- Occupations: Illustrator; Painter

Margaret Brynhild Parker (1907–1987) was a British illustrator and painter, and part of the East London Group. She signed herself Brynhild Parker.

She studied at the Slade School of Art from 1925 to 1928.

As well as painting, she illustrated books and designed advertising posters for Shell.

She moved to France in the 1940s, which influenced her style of painting, and spent the last years of her life in Antibes. She died in 1987.

Her painting The Entrance to the Port was exhibited at the Lefevre Gallery in 1938. Her works are in a number of collections, including those of Beecroft Art Gallery, Blackburn Museum and Art Gallery, Cheltenham Art Gallery & Museum, Doncaster Museum and Art Gallery, Leamington Spa Art Gallery & Museum, Manchester Art Gallery and the Ulster Museum. Shell posters using her designs are in the collections of the Museum of Modern Art in New York City, and the Victoria and Albert Museum.

== Works illustrated ==
- Thomson, Margaret R. (1925). Threads in the Web of Life.
- Thomson, Margaret R. (1941). Pond and River Life.
- Noble, Ernest (1945). Larry Goes Exploring. George Lapworth & Co.
- Noble, Ernest (1947). Larry And Dennis Get Into Mischief. George Lapworth & Co.
