= The Camden Town Murder =

Group of four paintings by Walter Sickert

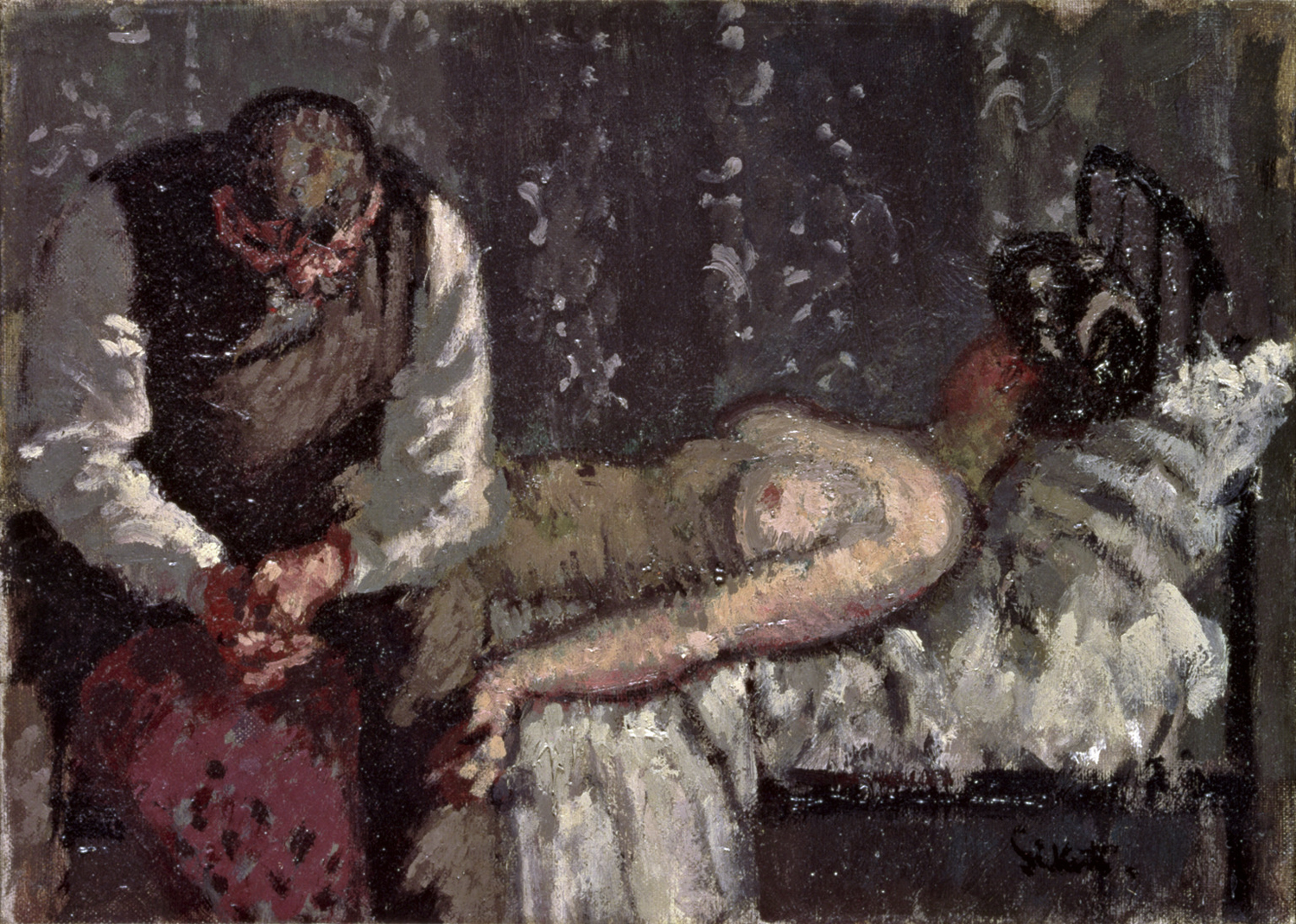
Walter Sickert, The Camden Town Murder (1908), originally titled, What Shall We Do for the Rent?, alternatively, What Shall We Do to Pay the Rent

The Camden Town Murder is a title given to a group of four paintings by Walter Sickert painted in 1908. The paintings have specific titles, such as the problem picture What Shall We Do for the Rent or What Shall We Do to Pay the Rent.

The collective title refers to the actual Camden Town Murder case from 1907 when the part-time prostitute Emily Dimmock was murdered in her own home while sleeping. Sickert's paintings do not actually depict violence, but they express a sad thoughtfulness.

== Description ==
The title of the group refers to the Camden Town Murder case of 1907. On 11 September Emily Dimmock, a part-time prostitute who had a partner, was murdered in her home at Agar Grove (then St Paul's Road), Camden, having gone there from The Eagle public house, Royal College Street. After sex, the man had cut her throat while she was asleep, then left in the morning. The murder became a source of prurient sensationalism in the press. For several years Sickert had been painting lugubrious female nudes on beds, and continued to do so, challenging the conventional approach to life painting—"The modern flood of representations of vacuous images dignified by the name of 'the nude' represents an artistic and intellectual bankruptcy"—giving four of them, which included a male figure, the title, The Camden Town Murder, and causing a controversy which ensured attention for his work.

The paintings do not show violence, but a sad thoughtfulness, explained by the fact that three of them were originally exhibited with completely different titles, one more appropriately being What Shall We Do for the Rent?, and the first in the series, Summer Afternoon.

Sickert's treatment of the murder can be connected with his obsession with the serial killer Jack the Ripper, who murdered five prostitutes in London 20 years earlier. Patricia Cornwell argued that Sickert himself was the Ripper, though this theory is not taken seriously by most experts, in part because Sickert was probably in France when the murders took place.

== See also ==
- Jack the Ripper's Bedroom, Sickert's earlier painting
- Theories regarding Sickert being Jack the Ripper

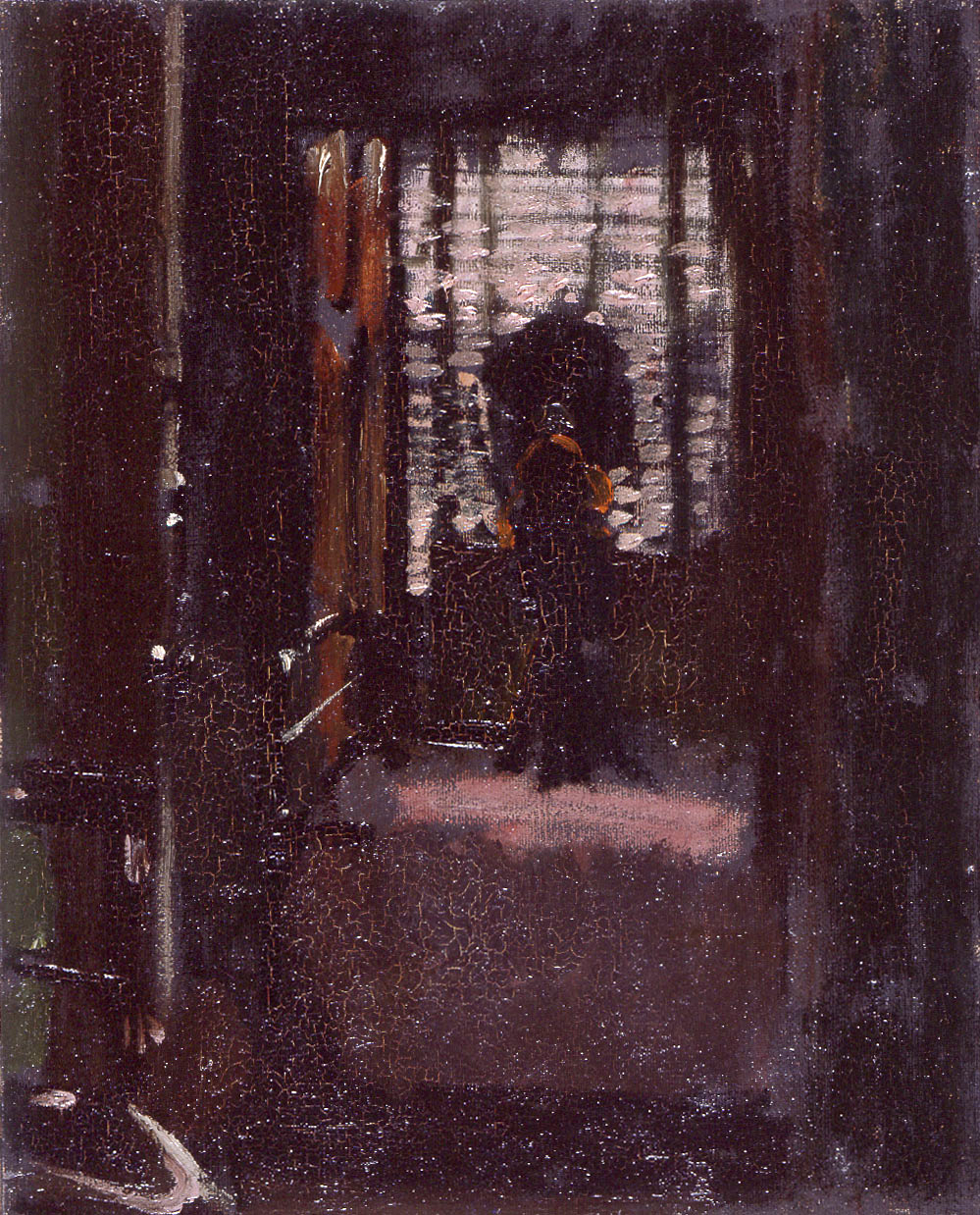
Sickert's earlier depiction of Jack the Ripper's Bedroom, which he believed he had lodged in
