= East London Group =

Group of artists active in 1920s and 1930s

The East London Group were a group of artists based in London. They worked and showed together from 1928 to 1936. They were mostly working class, realist painters whose formal education had often stopped at elementary school.

The group developed from an art club at the Bethnal Green Men's Institute to a group of artists showing and selling in London's West End and beyond. They exhibited alongside prominent artists of the day, and attracted enormous press coverage and support, taught by John Albert Cooper, Phyllis Bray, Walter Sickert and others. A few members had trained at the Slade School of Fine Art. The East London Group's drawings and paintings show buildings, streets, and ways of life that no longer exist.

== Background ==
In 1923, a warehouseman, a house decorator, three deck hands waiting for a ship, and a haddock smoker started an art club. It met twice a week at the Bethnal Green Men's Institute in Wolverley Street in East London. They found time and money for materials, despite having families and working long hours on piecework or for poor wages.

The Art Club grew strongly and held its first exhibition in 1924 at the Bethnal Green Museum. The tight-knit community of Bethnal Green turned out in force. There were around 30 active members, 15 of whom showed 88 works in this first show.

== Influence of John Cooper and Walter Sickert ==
John Cooper, who taught at Bethnal Green, eventually severed his connection with it after a disagreement. From the 1924-25 session he began teaching at the Bow and Bromley Evening Institute in Coborn Road, E3. To this he eventually attracted key members of the Bethnal Green Art Club, such as Walter Steggles, Harold Steggles and Elwin Hawthorne, whom he asked to join him at Bow in 1927.

The charismatic Cooper had served in the Royal Flying Corps during the First World War and then attended the Slade School of Fine Art. Newly graduated, he was a professional painter of portraits and landscapes, supplementing his income by teaching evening classes. His advice was to paint what was around, straight from life, rather than painting images for greetings cards or copying posters of film stars or seed packets.

Walter Sickert also lectured to and mentored the students. His message was the same as Cooper's: students did not need to go on expensive excursions to find landscapes to paint. ‘There is no need to go to Bognor,’ he said. ‘You can go into the Tube.’

Some artists connected with the Slade occasionally provided teaching assistance and showed with the Group. These included Phyllis Bray (to become Cooper's wife for a period), William Coldstream and Charles George Hamilton Dicker.

== Style ==
East London Group artists were able to see beauty in the most unlikely subjects, bringing ‘a warm feeling to their art which is transmitted to the viewer’.

The drabness of the East End, painted with a muted palette, is reflected in the early works. In the work of Elwin Hawthorne, the absence of people contributes to an almost surreal atmosphere. As the artists began to travel out of the city, the tone of the paintings lightens.

== Early success ==
In April 1927, the Daily Chronicle reported on the Bethnal Green Institute exhibition with headlines such as "Workmen as artists" and "Window cleaner’s work in East End show". Albert Turpin was the window cleaner who went on to become mayor of Bethnal Green, and made it his mission to record in paintings all the houses and streets around his home before the developers destroyed them. Other exhibitors included Henry Silk (basket maker), Elwin Hawthorne (errand boy) and C Warren (park-keeper) and B R Swinnerton (piano factory worker).

In December 1928 members of Cooper's Bow classes plus a few invited professional artists, all showing as the East London Art Club, held a large exhibition at the Whitechapel Art Gallery. This attracted support from a number of prominent individuals, such as Sir Joseph Duveen the art dealer, Samuel Courtauld, Lord Melchett, Lord Burnham and the writer Arnold Bennett.

The show prompted wide press coverage. ‘Little short of sensational,’ said the influential Studio magazine about the East London Art Club's December 1928 exhibition at the Whitechapel Art Gallery. The Evening News reported that work was shown from the Club's approximately ‘30 members drawn from Hackney, Whitechapel, East Ham, Poplar, Mile End and so on.’

A number of paintings were bought by Sir Joseph Duveen and by Charles Aitken, Director of the Tate Gallery, for exhibition at the National Gallery, Millbank, known colloquially even then as the Tate Gallery.

Part of the exhibition was shown at Millbank in early 1929, indicating ‘what British artisans can do in their spare time’, as the press release put it, and a modified Tate exhibition went on tour to the art gallery in Peel Park, Salford.

== East London Group exhibitions ==
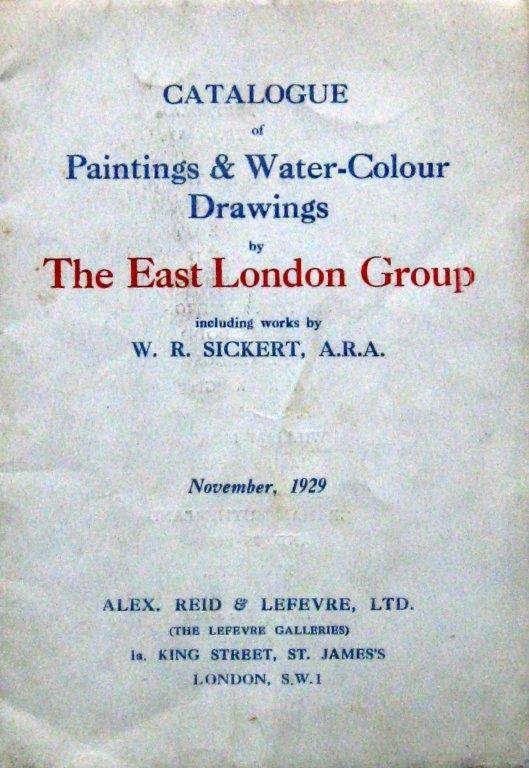
Catalogue for The Lefevre Gallery's November 1929 exhibition of works by The East London Group, "including works by W.R. Sickert, A.R.A."

A major breakthrough took place when the West End Lefevre Gallery agreed to give Cooper's students a first exhibition, now as the East London Group, in November 1929. Sickert's inclusion, his only showing with the group, was an important draw. Because of wide, complimentary press coverage, the show had to be extended into December.

"One of the most interesting and significant things in the London art season," said the Manchester Guardian about the first Lefevre exhibition. It covered just this one exhibition three times.

The show was an enormous commercial success, too, with interest shown by Mayfair art dealers and high society (including Ramsay MacDonald, Lady Cunard, Viscount D’Abernon, and Edward Marsh, a perceptive collector). The noted critic, T W Earp, particularly praised the work of some artists and so the careers were launched of, for example, William Coldstream, Murroe FitzGerald, Archibald Hattemore, Elwin Hawthorne, Cecil Osborne, Henry Silk, Harold Steggles, Walter Steggles and Albert Turpin. By this time Cooper was an established painter, especially of music and musicians, which feature in some of the group shows.

Eventually he negotiated a five-year group contract, resulting in eight annual Reid & Lefevre exhibitions through to 1936. Throughout the 1930s, a number of solo exhibitions were additionally held at Lefevre and elsewhere. Group exhibitions were also held outside London and members participated in numerous mixed shows, often alongside prominent artists.

1935 saw a touring exhibition of Canada and the US, organised through the Courtauld Institute whose founder, Samuel Courtauld, had remained an enthusiastic patron of the Group.

In 1936, works by Elwin Hawthorne and Walter Steggles were included in Britain's contribution to the 1936 Venice Biennale, alongside well known and established artists.

== Other work ==
Members of the East London Group also painted stage sets and made a film documenting their activities. Phyllis Bray painted three large murals at the New People's Palace (now part of Queen Mary, University of London). John Cooper, Elwin Hawthorne, Brynhild Parker, Harold Steggles and Walter Steggles contributed to the popular range of Shell advertising posters. John Cooper played a major part in developing mosaic work through his courses at the Central School of Arts and Crafts.

== After 1936 ==
The last Lefevre show took place in 1936. For personal and professional reasons, John Cooper withdrew from the Group which then wound down. Lefevre believed its role in establishing the artists had been fulfilled.

Cooper's death in 1943 at 49, from sclerosis of the spine, was a major factor preventing the Group reassembling after the Second World War. Several Group members continued to paint but they never exhibited as the East London Group again.

== Members ==
- George Board
- Phyllis Bray
- B. A. R. (Sam) Carter
- Doris Emerson Chapman
- Hannah Cohen
- William Coldstream
- John Albert Cooper
- C G Hamilton Dicker
- Elsie Farleigh
- Murroe FitzGerald
- Archibald Hattemore
- Elwin Hawthorne
- James Izant
- James C King
- Lilian Leahy
- G M McCarthy
- W S Mummery
- Patrick Murphy
- Cecil Osborne
- Grace Oscroft
- B Nelson Parker
- Brynhild Parker
- M G Pole
- Ruth Salaman (to become Ruth Collet)
- Maurice M Shaer
- Walter Sickert
- Henry Silk
- C Spelling
- F Spelling
- Harold Steggles
- Walter Steggles
- R R Tomlinson
- Albert Turpin
- Eunice Veitch
- A J Wetherly

== Comparisons ==
Comparisons are sometimes drawn with the work of other artists. These include:

- Edward Hopper (1882-1967) especially his Early Sunday Morning, painted in 1930, the year after Cecil Osborne's 1929 Sunday Morning, Farringdon Road.
- The 1920-33 Canadian landscape painters, the Group of Seven (also known as the Algonquin School).
- Gustave Caillebotte
- Maurice Utrillo. Paul George Konody of the Daily Mail wrote of the 1930 Lefevre exhibition: ‘If an Utrillo of London is to come into being – a painter who would interpret London not only as we see it but as we feel it – he will come from among the members of the East London Group and his name will either be Elwin Hawthorne or Walter Steggles.’
- The Ashington Group (the ‘Pitmen Painters’) who also began, a few years after the East London Group, as untrained amateurs and were influenced by an enlightened teacher.

== Current interest ==
Most of the East London Group's work is held privately, often by members of the artists’ families. Around 80 pieces are in public collections in Britain and abroad.

Awareness of the Group's achievements has been rekindled in recent years. There have been a number of exhibitions (in central London and at Bow Arts' Nunnery Gallery) and the publication of a book, From Bow to Biennale by David Buckman.

There is keen bidding at sales, notably Sotheby's and Christie's South Kensington, and an active and participatory Twitter account. New exhibitions are planned in Southend (2016), Bow (2017) and Southampton (2017).
