= Anna Gruetzner Robins =

Canadian art historian

- Born: Canada
- Education: University of Toronto; Courtauld Institute of Art
- Occupations: Professor, art historian
- Employer: University of Reading
- Known for: Walter Sickert expertise
- Spouse: David Robins (died 2007)

Anna Gruetzner Robins is a Canadian art historian who is a professor at the University of Reading. She is a specialist in the art of Walter Sickert about which she has written three books. She completed her BA degree at the University of Toronto and her MA and PhD at the Courtauld Institute of Art.

In 2011, Gruetzner Robins identified 23 unsigned watercolours at Princeton University as being by the artist Gwen John

Gruetzner Robins was married to the journalist and sociologist David Robins.

== Selected publications ==
- Walter Sickert: Drawings. Theory and practice: Word and image, Scolar Press, 1996.
- Modern art in Britain 1910–1914. Merrell Holberton, London, 1997.
- Walter Sickert. The complete art criticism. Oxford University Press, Oxford, 2000.
- A Fragile Modernism: Whistler and his impressionist followers. Yale University Press for the Paul Mellon Centre for Studies in British Art, New Haven, 2007.
