= The Integrity of Belgium =

Painting by Walter Sickert

- Artist: Walter Sickert
- Year: 1914
- Type: Oil on canvas, war art
- Dimensions: 92.5 cm × 71.5 cm (36.4 in × 28.1 in)
- Location: Government Art Collection, London

The Integrity of Belgium is a 1914 oil painting by the British artist Walter Sickert. It depicts an officer of the Belgian Army kneeling as he looks through binoculars, while nearby soldiers man a trench during the fighting of the First World War. Its sympathetic portrayal came against the backdrop of public outrage over the Rape of Belgium committed by the invading Germans, particularly in Britain which had gone to war explicitly to uphold Belgian independence. He produced this painting as a follow-up to Soldiers of King Albert at the Ready. The picture was first publicly displayed at a special exhibition held at the Royal Academy of Arts in early 1915 in support of war relief. It was acquired for the Government Art Collection in 1991.

== Bibliography ==
- Baron, Wendy. Sickert: Paintings and Drawings. Yale University Press, 2006.
- Sturgis, Matthew. Walter Sickert: A Biography. HarperCollins, 2005.
- Sutton, Denys. Walter Sickert: A Biography. Joseph, 1976.
- Walsh, Michael J.K. (ed.) London, Modernism, and 1914. Cambridge University Press, 2010.
