= Brighton Pierrots =

Painting by Walter Sickert

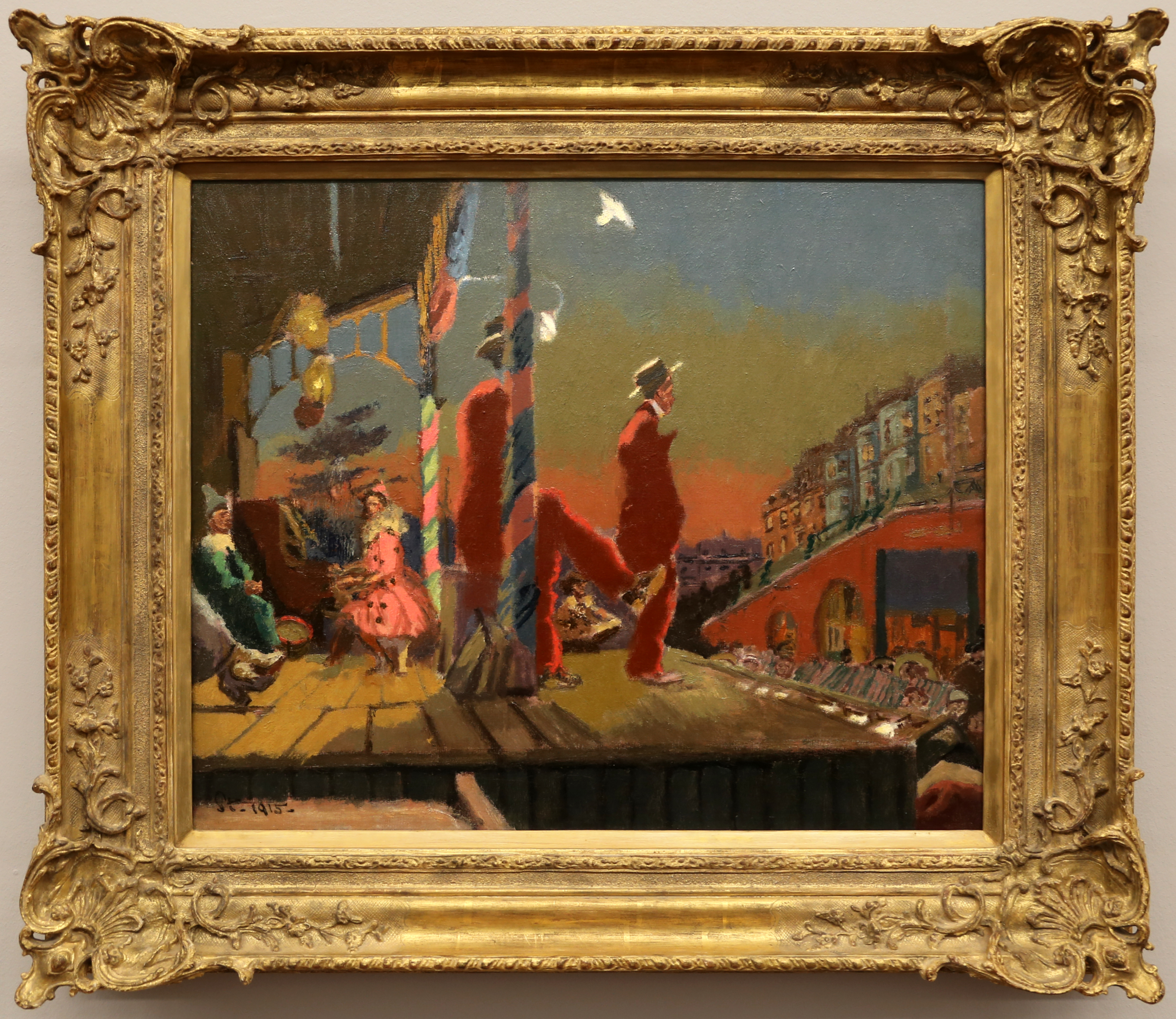
- Artist: Walter Sickert
- Year: 1915
- Medium: Oil on canvas
- Dimensions: 63.5 cm × 76.2 cm (25.0 in × 30.0 in)
- Location: Tate Britain; London (second version)

Brighton Pierrots is an oil on canvas painting by German-British painter Walter Sickert, from 1915. It depicts an outdoor theatrical performance. It is held in the Tate Britain, in London.

== History and description ==
In the painting, the Pierrots are seen from the side and slightly from behind. A few spectators' faces can be seen as well as empty deckchairs. The red evening sky is vivid, a reminder of a conflagration, a distant fire.

Born in 1860, Sickert was too old either to enlist or be conscripted in 1914. He experienced the First World War at a distance and in 1915 painted the unsettling Brighton Pierrots. Brighton at that time was a holiday town with no sense of holiday; the young men were away, and the distant sound of gunfire could be heard from across the Channel. Sickert's painting's subject matter is of the attempt to 'Keep Merry and Carry on', shadowed by an air of desperation.

The artist painted two versions of the subject. The first is now at the Ashmolean Museum, Oxford. The second, in Tate’s collection, was commissioned by the barrister William Jowitt and his wife. The paintings are practically identical apart from small variations in composition and appearance.
