= Soldiers of King Albert at the Ready =

Painting by Walter Sickert

- Artist: Walter Sickert
- Year: 1914
- Type: Oil on canvas, war art
- Dimensions: 211.5 cm × 166.4 cm (83.3 in × 65.5 in)
- Location: Graves Art Gallery, Sheffield

Soldiers of King Albert at the Ready is a 1914 oil painting by the British artist Walter Sickert. It depicts soldiers of the Belgian Army at the Battle of Liège during August 1914 in the opening weeks of the First World War. The German Army had invaded Belgium as part of the Schlieffen Plan, but were surprised by the fierce resistance they encountered from the Belgians. This significantly slowed the German attempt to knock France out of the war before the British could fully mobilise in support of them. Sickert had been born in Munich to a German father, but he was staunchly pro-Allied. Stylistically it was impressionist in nature.

Sickert had been a key figure in the Camden Town Group in the years before the war. The picture may have initially been inspired by a photograph he had seen in a newspaper of the fighting at Liège, but the composition was entirely his own and he began work in October borrowing Belgian uniforms with the assistance of the authorities. The painting was first exhibited at the New English Art Club in London in the winter of 1914, priced at 500 guineas to raise funds for the Belgian Relief Fund. He also displayed a similar-themed painting The Integrity of Belgium at the special war relief exhibition staged at the Royal Academy in early 1915. The picture was acquired by the Graves Art Gallery in Sheffield in 1969.

== Bibliography ==
- Baron, Wendy. Sickert: Paintings and Drawings. Yale University Press, 2006.
- Peppis, Paul. Literature, Politics, and the English Avant-Garde: Nation and Empire, 1901-1918. Cambridge University Press, 2000.
- Sturgis, Matthew. Walter Sickert: A Biography. HarperCollins, 2005.
- Sutton, Denys. Walter Sickert: A Biography. Joseph, 1976.
