= Café des Tribunaux, Dieppe =

Painting by Walter Sickert

- Artist: Walter Sickert
- Year: 1890
- Type: Oil on canvas, landscape painting
- Dimensions: 60.3 cm × 73 cm (23.7 in × 29 in)
- Location: Tate Britain, London

Café des Tribunaux, Dieppe is an 1890 oil painting by the British artist Walter Sickert. It depicts a street scene in the Normandy coastal town of Dieppe featuring the Café des Tribunaux, a local landmark. Sickert had often visited the town during his childhood and later settled there between 1898 and 1905. A protégée of James McNeill Whistler, Sickert was a major figure of British Impressionism and was later part of the Camden Town Group

The work was first displayed at the exhibition staged by the New English Art Club in 1891 The painting was given to the Tate Gallery in 1917 by Sylvia Gosse, Sickert's pupil and close friend. Another veiw of the Café, produced the same year, is now in the collection of the National Gallery of Canada.

== Bibliography ==
- Baron, Wendy. Sickert: Paintings and Drawings. Yale University Press, 2006.
- Sturgis, Matthew. Walter Sickert: A Biography. HarperCollins, 2005.
