= Problem play =

Theater with debate on social issues

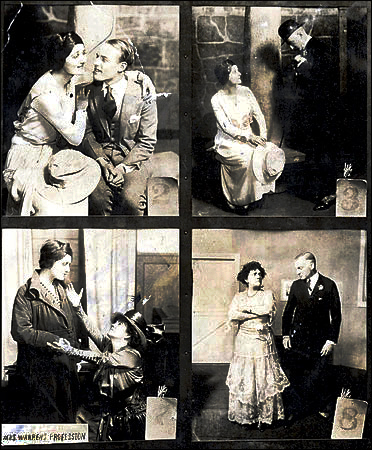
Scenes from a 1918 production of Mrs Warren's Profession by Bernard Shaw, an archetypal 'problem play'

The problem play is a form of drama that emerged during the 19th century as part of the wider movement of realism in the arts, especially following the innovations of Henrik Ibsen. It deals with contentious social issues through debates between the characters on stage, who typically represent conflicting points of view within a realistic social context. Critic Chris Baldick writes that the genre emerged "from the ferment of the 1890s... for the most part inspired by the example of Ibsen's realistic stage representations of serious familial and social conflicts." He summarises it as follows:

Rejecting the frivolity of intricately plotted romantic intrigues in the nineteenth-century French tradition of the 'well-made play', it favoured instead the form of the 'problem play', which would bring to life some contemporary controversy of public importance—women's rights, unemployment, penal reform, class privilege—in a vivid but responsibly accurate presentation.

The critic F. S. Boas adapted the term to characterise certain plays by William Shakespeare that he considered to have characteristics similar to Ibsen's 19th-century problem plays. As a result, the term is also used more broadly and retrospectively to describe any tragicomic dramas that do not fit easily into the classical generic distinction between comedy and tragedy.

== Early "problem plays" ==
While plays in ancient Greece and ancient Rome, mystery plays, and Elizabethan plays are clearly classified as tragedy, comedy, and satyr plays, there are some plays that exhibit the characteristics of problem plays, such as Euripides' Alcestis.

== Shakespeare ==
Boas used the term to refer to a group of Shakespeare's plays which seem to contain both comic and tragic elements: Measure for Measure, All's Well That Ends Well, and Troilus and Cressida. He wrote that "throughout these plays we move along dim untrodden paths, and at the close our feeling is neither of simple joy nor pain; we are excited, fascinated, perplexed, for the issues raised preclude a completely satisfactory outcome." Later critics have used the term for other plays, including Timon of Athens and The Merchant of Venice.

== 19th-century drama ==
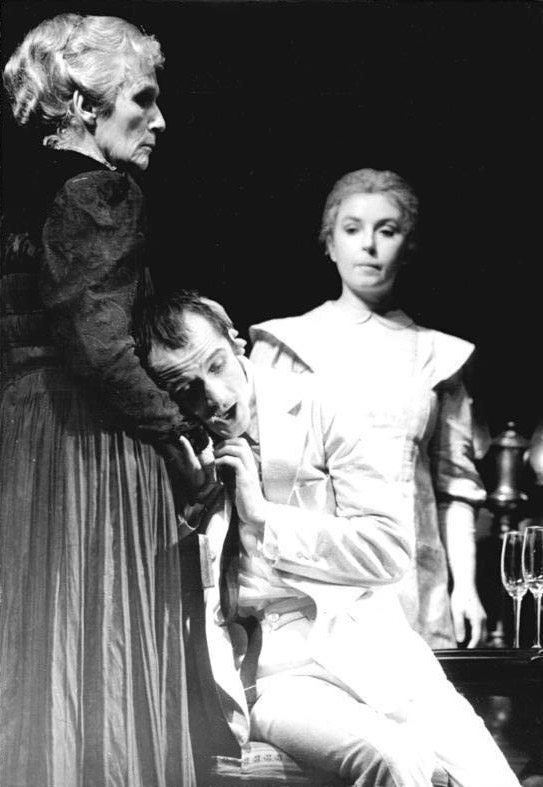
A performance of Ibsen's Ghosts, one of the defining problem plays, in Berlin, 1983

While social debates in drama were nothing new, the problem play of the 19th century was distinguished by its intent to confront the spectator with the dilemmas experienced by the characters. The earliest forms of the problem play are to be found in the work of French writers such as Alexandre Dumas, fils, who dealt with the subject of prostitution in The Lady of the Camellias (1852). Other French playwrights followed suit with dramas about a range of social issues, sometimes approaching the subject in a moralistic, sometimes in a sentimental manner. Critic Thomas H. Dickinson, writing in 1927, argued that these early problem plays were hampered by the dramatic conventions of the day: "No play written in the problem form was significant beyond the value of the idea that was its underlying motive for existence. No problem play had achieved absolute beauty, or a living contribution to truth."

The most important exponent of the problem play, however, was the Norwegian writer Henrik Ibsen, whose work combined penetrating characterisation with emphasis on topical social issues, usually concentrated on the moral dilemmas of a central character. In a series of plays Ibsen addressed a range of problems, most notably the restriction of women's lives in A Doll's House (1879), sexually transmitted disease in Ghosts (1882) and provincial greed in An Enemy of the People (1882). Ibsen's dramas proved immensely influential, spawning variants of the problem play in works by George Bernard Shaw and other later dramatists.

== 20th century ==
The genre was especially influential in the early 20th century. In Britain plays such as Houghton's Hindle Wakes (1912), developed the genre to shift the nature of the 'problem'. This "resolutely realistic problem play set in domestic interiors of the mill town Hindle" starts with the 'problem' of an apparently seduced woman, but ends with the woman herself rejected due to her status as a victim of seduction: "the 'problem' is not, after all, the redemption of a betrayed maiden's tarnished honour, but the readiness of her respectable elders to determine a young woman's future for her without regard to her rights—including here her right to erotic holiday enjoyment."

In America the problem play was associated with the emergence of debates over civil rights issues. Racial issues were tackled in plays such as Angelina Weld Grimké's, Rachel. It was a tool of the socialist theatre in the 1920s and 30s, and overlapped with forms of documentary theatre in works such as Carl Crede's Paragraph 218 (1930), which concerns the issue of abortion, and which was directed by Erwin Piscator.

== See also ==
- Kitchen sink drama
- Problem novel
- Problem picture
- Social novel
- Very special episode
