= Phyllis Bray =

English painter (1911-1991)

- At work on the People’s Palace murals, 1936
- Born: 30 August 1911; Norwood, London, England
- Died: 1991 (aged 79–80); Hampstead, London, England
- Known for: Painting, book illustration, murals
- Spouse(s): John Cooper, Eric Phillips

Phyllis Bray (30 August 1911 – 1991) was a British artist and illustrator known for involvement in the East London Group of artists, for the murals she produced and for illustrating children's books. During her career she also exhibited at the Royal Academy and at several leading London galleries.

== Early life and education ==
Bray was born in Norwood in west London. Her father, William de Bray, was a British diplomat, who was at one point an attaché to the court of the mother of Tsar Nicholas II of Russia. Bray obtained a scholarship to study at the Slade School of Art from 1927 to 1931, where her tutor was Henry Tonks. At the Slade Bray won several prizes.

== Career ==
In 1933 she was elected to the London Group and also married her first husband, the artist, and fellow evening-class teacher, John Cooper and together they were to become core members of the East London Group.

Bray became known for her landscapes, which she painted in both oils and watercolours, and for her murals. For over forty years Bray worked with the muralist Hans Feibusch painting in churches across Britain. A series of twelve murals, completed in 1964, by Feibusch and Bray, in the central hall of Newport Civic Centre depicts the history of Newport.

Bray also worked on a number of solo projects, such as the three murals, on Music, Drama and Ballet, she produced for the People's Palace on the Mile End Road in east London. These works were thought to have been destroyed but large sections of them were rediscovered, under layers of later painting, when the building was acquired by Queen Mary University of London and are now on display again.

A mural Bray painted for St Crispin's Church in Bermondsey remains intact.

Several leading publishers, including the Oxford University Press and Faber & Faber, commissioned Bray to illustrate books, including several works for children. Bray also designed a 1938 poster for London Transport promoting the Wimbledon tennis championship.

Bray designed advertising material for Shell-Mex & BP and for the John Lewis Partnership. Throughout the 1950s and 1960s Bray built up a collection of jewellery, mostly from the medieval and Renaissance periods, which was sold at Christie's in 1989.

== Exhibitions and museum collections ==
Bray exhibited at the Royal Academy in 1950, 1952, 1955 and in 1960. Her work was included in group shows at the Leicester Galleries in London and she had solo shows Drian Gallery in London and the Mignion Gallery in Bath.

The Walker Art Gallery in Liverpool, the Blackpool Art Gallery, New College, Oxford, and the UK Government Art Collection hold examples of her work. A memorial exhibition was held in 1998 at the Collyer Bristow gallery; the exhibition space within the offices of law firm Collyer Bristow.

Phyllis Bray: Myth & Nature, a retrospective exhibition is on show at The Batsford Gallery in Hackney, East London until 21 June 2026.
