= Camden Town Murder =

1907 murder in London

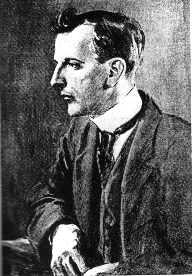
Robert Wood

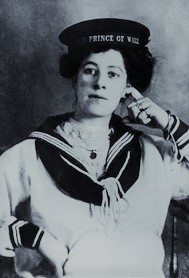
Emily Dimmock

The Camden Town murder was a murder which took place in Camden Town, London, England, in 1907. Robert Wood, an artist, was tried for the murder of sex worker Emily Dimmock and acquitted after a defence by Edward Marshall Hall.

On 11 September 1907, Emily Elizabeth Dimmock (known as Phyllis), a part-time sex worker in a relationship with Bertram Shaw, a railwayman, was murdered in her home at Agar Grove (then 29 St Paul's Road), Camden, having gone there from The Eagle public house, Royal College Street. Her attacker had slit her throat while she was asleep, then left in the morning. On the 12th, Shaw returned home during the evening to find his room locked. He borrowed a key from a neighbour, and upon entering found Phyllis lying naked on the bed, throat cut from ear to ear. It was a savage but skillful attack on her from the nature of the wound. Nothing much had been taken from the flat, and the motive was a mystery; the case quickly became a sensation.

After initial difficulty, the police investigation led by Inspector Neill centred on Robert Wood, an artist. A former girlfriend of Wood's, Ruby Young, recognised his handwriting on a postcard found in Dimmock's room, which had been published in many newspapers; she mentioned the similarity of the handwriting to a friend who worked in Fleet Street. Wood was put on trial for the murder, during which Marshall Hall displayed the kind of effective and dramatic cross-examination for which he was known. Marshall Hall was convinced of Wood's innocence, and also of the fallibility of the prosecution case. The judge Mr Justice Grantham departed from the pro-conviction stance he was expected to take mid-summing up, and made it clear he thought the jury should acquit. They did, after retiring for 15 minutes between 7:45 and 8:00 pm.

The artist Walter Sickert adopted the phrase The Camden Town Murder for a series of etchings, paintings and drawings in 1908–09, in each of which the subjects are a clothed man and a nude woman. It was dramatised in 'The Post Card' an episode of the radio crime anthology series The Black Museum, in 1952, starring Orson Welles, and also in the episode of Secrets of Scotland Yard - 'Scales of Justice' - starring Clive Brook. A television series, Killer in Close-Up, dramatised by George F. Kerr, featured the case in the episode "The Robert Wood Trial". The episode was produced by Sydney television station ABN-2 and broadcast on 4 September 1957. More than thirty years later, the court case featured in an episode of the BBC series Shadow of the Noose in 1989, with Jonathan Hyde as Marshall Hall, and Peter Capaldi as Wood.
