= Richard Shone =

British art historian and art critic

Richard Shone (born 1949) is a British art historian and art critic specializing in British modern art, and from 2003–15 was the editor of The Burlington Magazine.

== Career ==
At age 16, Shone was already well enough connected in the British art world that Duncan Grant introduced him to his neighbor Lydia Lopokova, the widow of John Maynard Keynes, at her and Keynes's house, where Shone saw work by Seurat, Cézanne, Delacroix, Picasso, Braque and Grant himself. Having obtained a BA in English from the University of Cambridge in 1971, Shone was through the 1970s and 1980s a prolific reviewer in the art press - The Burlington Magazine, Art Review, Artforum - as well as a contributor on literature and biography to The Spectator and The Guardian. Shone curated several exhibitions dedicated to British art, such as Walter Sickert’s portraits at the Victoria Art Gallery in Bath (1990); a full Sickert retrospective at the Royal Academy of Arts in London and Van Gogh Museum in Amsterdam (1992–93, with Wendy Baron); The Art of Bloomsbury for the Tate Gallery, London (1999). Shone joined The Burlington Magazine in 1979.

== Selected publications ==
Shone's chief contributions to art history have been made in the field of early twentieth-century British painting but he has written extensively on the art of the Young British Artists since they emerged in the late 1980s.

- Bloomsbury Portraits: Vanessa Bell, Duncan Grant and their Circle (Phaidon, 1976) 0714829617
- The Century of Change: British Painting since 1900 0714817821 (Phaidon 1977)
- The Post-Impressionists 0706410939 (Calmann, Blacker, Cooper, 1979)
- Augustus John 0714819980 (Phaidon 1979)
- Rodrigo Moynihan 0500973709(Skira/ Thames & Hudson 1988)
- Walter Sickert 0714824798 (Phaidon 1988)
- Sisley 0714826871 (Phaidon 1992)
- Sensation 0500237522 (Royal Academy, 1997)
- The Art of Bloomsbury Roger Fry, Vanessa Bell and Duncan Grant. (Princeton: Princeton University Press, 1999). ISBN 0691049939
- Sickert: The Theatre of Life (Piano Nobile, 2021) ISBN 978-1901192599
