= The Ransom (Millais painting) =

Painting by John Everett Millais

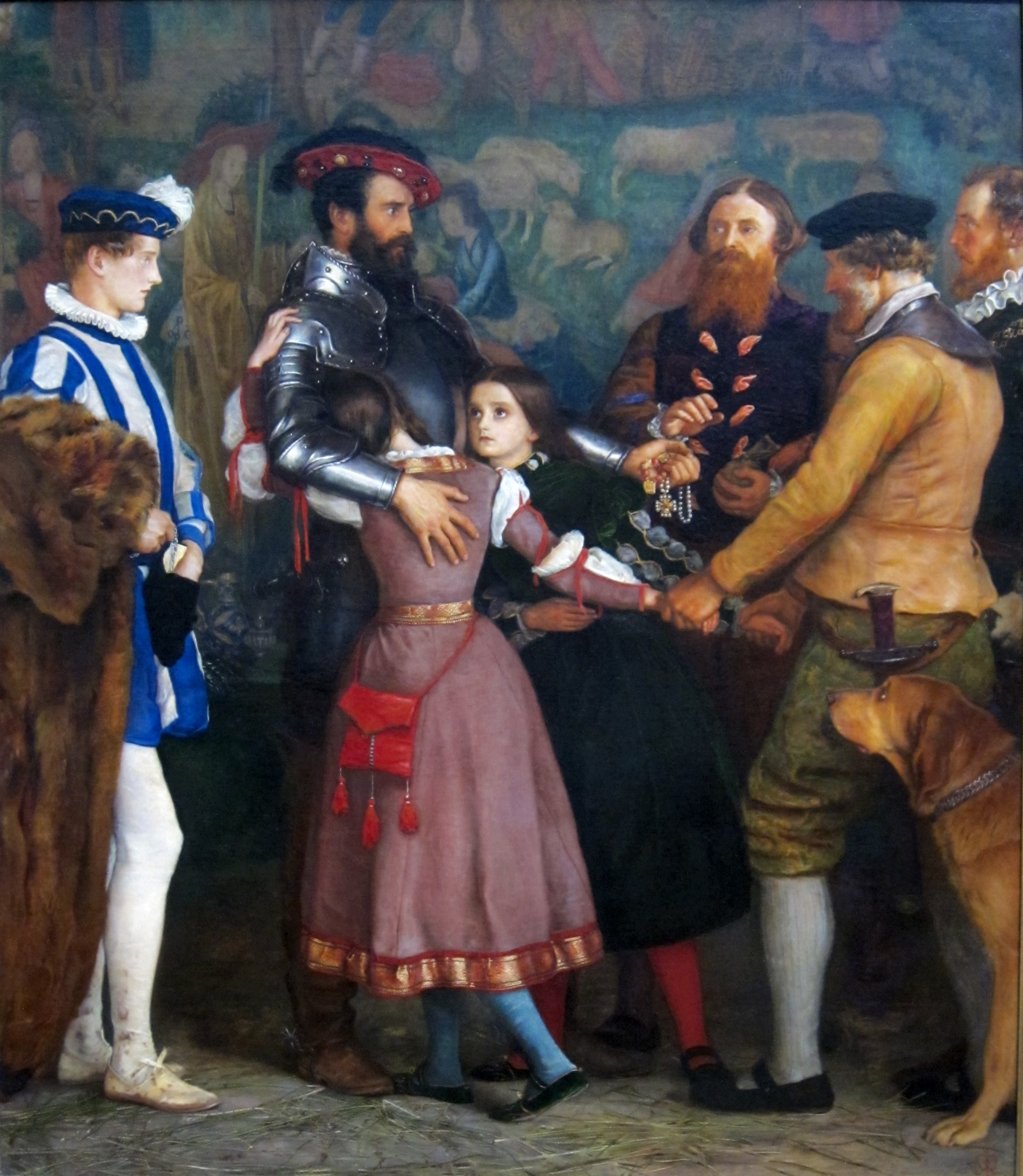
- Artist: John Everett Millais
- Year: 1860–1862
- Type: oil on canvas
- Dimensions: 134 cm × 115.9 cm (53 in × 45.6 in)
- Location: Getty Center, Los Angeles, California

The Ransom or The Hostage is an 1860–1862 oil painting by the English artist John Everett Millais. It shows a fictional scene set in the sixteenth century, where a knight accompanied by his page is paying a ransom to brigands for the return of his two daughters. It is signed with Millais' monogram and dated 1862.

== The painting ==
Millais commenced work on The Ransom, together with his painting Trust Me, in the autumn of 1860; it was not finished until the spring of 1862.

Effie Gray, Millais' wife, provided some details about the production of the painting. The model for the head of the knight was originally Millais' friend Major Boothby, but was found unsuitable by Millais, who then used a Mr Miller instead. The body of the knight was drawn from "a gigantic railway guard, appropriately named 'Strong', who was afterwards crushed to death in Perth Station." The page was a youth named Reid; Major McBean of the 92nd Highlanders and a labourer sat for the guards. Miss Helen Petrie modelled for both the girls. Most of the costumes were made by Effie, and the tapestry was painted in an unfinished part of the South Kensington Museum (opened in 1857, now the Victoria and Albert Museum) not far from the artist's home, where it had been hung by a decorator for the artist.

The painting hung in the Royal Academy Exhibition of 1862, catalogue number 198, along with Trust Me.

The painting hung in a special Winter Exhibition at the Royal Academy, London, held between January and March 1898, which featured many collected works of the late Millais (catalogue number 30). At the time it was the property of W. Kenrick, Esq., M. P..

The painting was bought by the J. Paul Getty Museum in 1972.

== See also ==
- List of paintings by John Everett Millais
