= Walter Sickert =

British artist (1860–1942)

Walter Sickert RA RBA
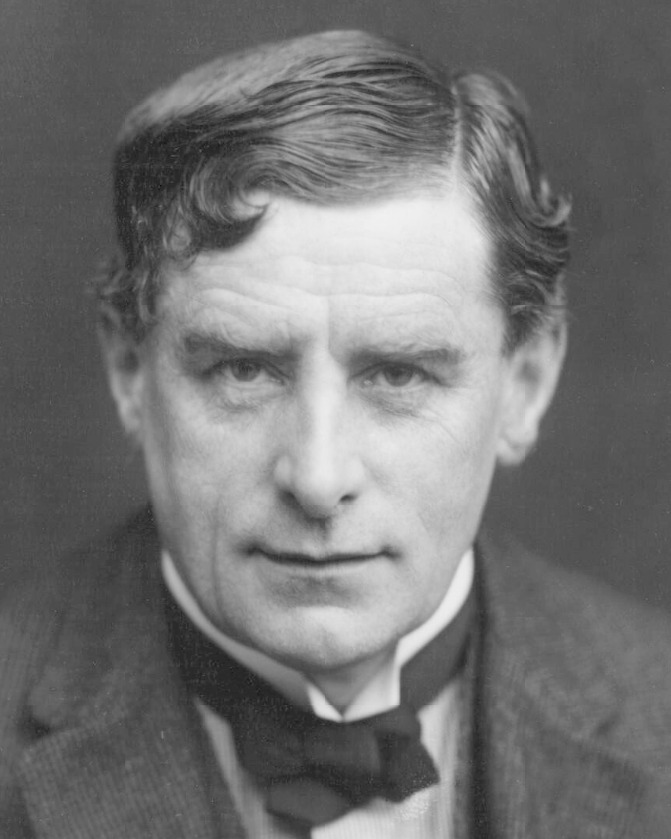
- Portrait by George Charles Beresford, 1911
- Born: 31 May 1860; Munich, Kingdom of Bavaria
- Died: 22 January 1942 (aged 81); Bath, Somerset, England
- Resting place: Church of St Nicholas, Bathampton
- Education: University College School; King's College School
- Known for: Painting
- Notable work: The Camden Town Murder; Ennui
- Movement: Post-Impressionism
- Spouses: Ellen Cobden (m. 1885; div. 1899); Christine Angus (m. 1911; died 1920); Thérèse Lessore (m. 1926)
- Elected: Royal Academy; Royal Society of British Artists

Walter Richard Sickert (31 May 1860 – 22 January 1942) was a German-born British painter and printmaker who was a member of the Camden Town Group of Post-Impressionist artists in early 20th-century London. He was an important influence on distinctively British styles of avant-garde art in the mid and late 20th century.

Sickert was a cosmopolitan and an eccentric who often favoured ordinary people and urban scenes as his subjects. His work includes portraits of well-known personalities and images derived from press photographs. He is considered a prominent figure in the transition from Impressionism to Modernism.

== Training and early career ==
Sickert was born in Munich, Kingdom of Bavaria, on 31 May 1860, the eldest son of Oswald Sickert, a Danish artist, and his English wife, Eleanor Louisa Henry, who was the illegitimate daughter of the astronomer Richard Sheepshanks. In 1868, following the German annexation of Schleswig-Holstein, the family settled in England, where Oswald's work had been recommended by Freiherrin Rebecca von Kreusser to Ralph Nicholson Wornum, who was Keeper of the National Gallery at the time. The family eventually settled in London and obtained British nationality.

The young Sickert was sent to University College School from 1870 to 1871, before transferring to King's College School, where he studied until the age of 18. Though he was the son and grandson of painters, he first sought a career as an actor; he appeared in small parts in Sir Henry Irving's company before taking up the study of art in 1881. After less than a year's attendance at the Slade School, Sickert left to become a pupil of and etching assistant to James Abbott McNeill Whistler. Sickert's earliest paintings were small tonal studies painted alla prima from nature after Whistler's example.

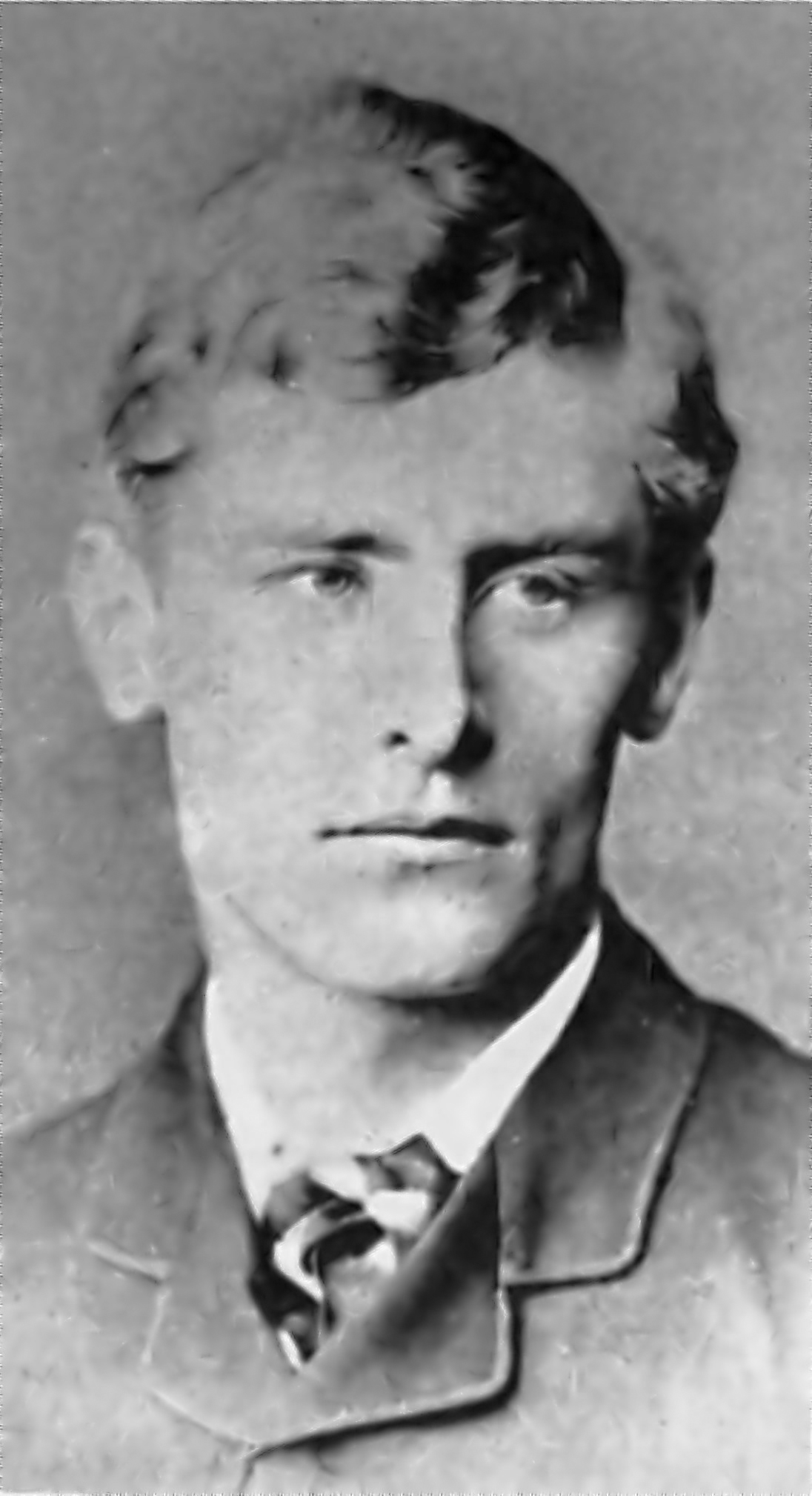
Portrait of Sickert in 1884

In 1883 he travelled to Paris and met Edgar Degas, whose use of pictorial space and emphasis on drawing would have a powerful effect on Sickert's work. "Degas provided the counterweight to Whistler, and one which was eventually to prove the more significant for Sickert's development." He developed a personal version of Impressionism, favouring sombre colouration. Following Degas' advice, Sickert painted in the studio, working from drawings and memory as an escape from "the tyranny of nature". In 1888 Sickert joined the New English Art Club, a group of French-influenced realist artists. Sickert's first major works, dating from the late 1880s, were portrayals of scenes in London music halls. One of the two paintings he exhibited at the NEAC in April 1888, Katie Lawrence at Gatti's, which portrayed a well-known music hall singer of the era, incited controversy "more heated than any other surrounding an English painting in the late 19th century". Sickert's rendering was denounced as ugly and vulgar, and his choice of subject matter was deplored as too tawdry for art, as female performers were popularly viewed as morally akin to prostitutes. The painting announced what would be Sickert's recurring interest in sexually provocative themes.

In the late 1880s he spent much of his time in France, especially in Dieppe, which he first visited in mid-1885, and where his mistress, and possibly his illegitimate son, lived. During this period Sickert began writing art criticism for various publications, including Herbert Vivian and Ruaraidh Erskine's The Whirlwind. Between 1894 and 1904, Sickert made a series of visits to Venice, initially focusing on the city's topography; it was during his last painting trip in 1903–04 that, forced indoors by inclement weather, he developed a distinctive approach to the multiple-figure tableau that he further explored on his return to Britain. The models for many of the Venetian paintings are believed to have been prostitutes, whom Sickert might have known through being a client.

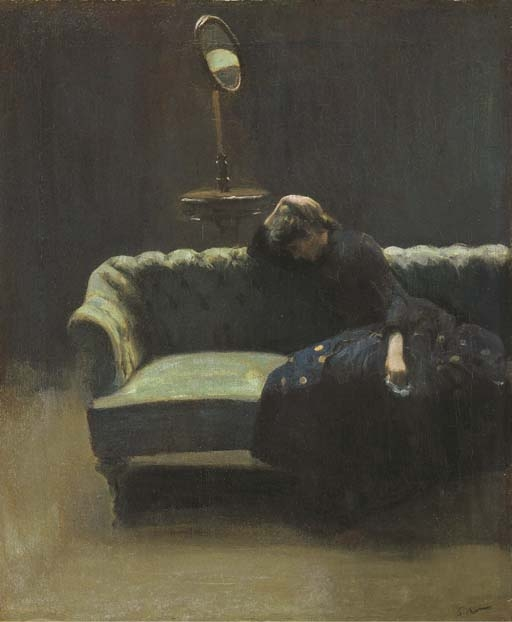
The Acting Manager or Rehearsal: The End of the Act, (portrait of Helen Carte), c. 1885

Sickert's fascination with urban culture accounted for his acquisition of studios in working-class sections of London, first in Cumberland Market in the 1890s, then in Camden Town in 1905. The latter location provided an event that would secure Sickert's prominence in the realist movement in Britain.

On 11 September 1907, Emily Dimmock, a prostitute cheating on her partner, was murdered in her home at Agar Grove (then St Paul's Road), Camden. After sexual intercourse the man had slit her throat open while she was asleep, then left in the morning. The Camden Town murder became an ongoing source of prurient sensationalism in the press. For several years Sickert had already been painting lugubrious female nudes on beds, and continued to do so, deliberately challenging the conventional approach to life painting—"The modern flood of representations of vacuous images dignified by the name of 'the nude' represents an artistic and intellectual bankruptcy"—giving four of them, which included a male figure, the title The Camden Town Murder, and causing a controversy which ensured attention for his work. These paintings do not show violence, however, but a sad thoughtfulness, explained by the fact that three of them were originally exhibited with completely different titles, one more appropriately being What Shall We Do for the Rent?, and the first in the series, Summer Afternoon.

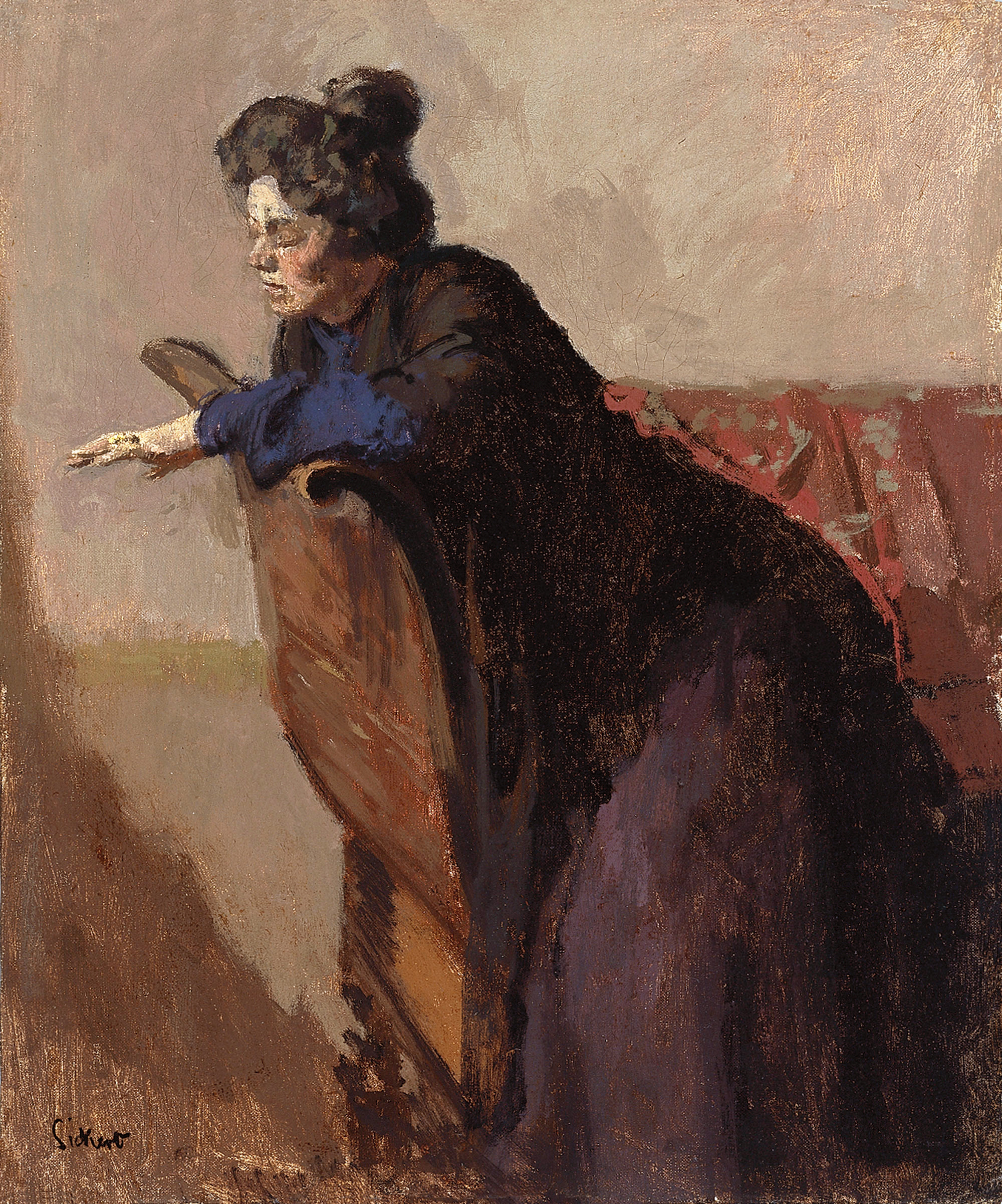
La Giuseppina, the Ring (1903–1905)

While the painterly handling of the works inspired comparison to Impressionism, and the emotional tone suggested a narrative more comparable to genre painting, specifically Degas's Interior, the documentary realism of the Camden Town paintings was without precedent in British art. These and other works were painted in heavy impasto and narrow tonal range. Sickert's best-known work, Ennui (c. 1914), reveals his interest in Victorian narrative genres. The composition, which exists in at least five painted versions and was also made into an etching, depicts a couple in a dingy interior gazing abstractedly into empty space, "psychologically estranged from one another".

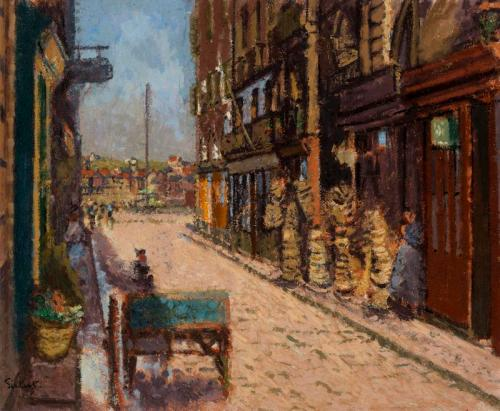
The Basket Shop, Rue St Jean, Dieppe (c. 1911–1912), Aberdeen Archives, Gallery and Museums

Just before the First World War he championed the avant-garde artists Lucien Pissarro, Jacob Epstein, Augustus John and Wyndham Lewis. At the same time Sickert founded, with other artists, the Camden Town Group of British painters, named from the district of London in which he lived. This group had been meeting informally since 1905, but was officially established in 1911. It was influenced by Post-Impressionism and Expressionism, but concentrated on scenes of often drab suburban life; Sickert himself said he preferred the kitchen to the drawing room as a scene for paintings.

From 1908 to 1912, and again from 1915 to 1918, he taught at the Westminster School of Art. Lilian Lancaster, David Bomberg, Wendela Boreel, Mary Godwin, and John Doman Turner were among his students. He founded a private art school, Rowlandson House, on Hampstead Road in 1910. It lasted until 1914; for most of that period its co-principal and chief financial supporter was the painter Sylvia Gosse, a former student of Sickert. He also briefly set up an art school in Manchester where his students included Harry Rutherford.

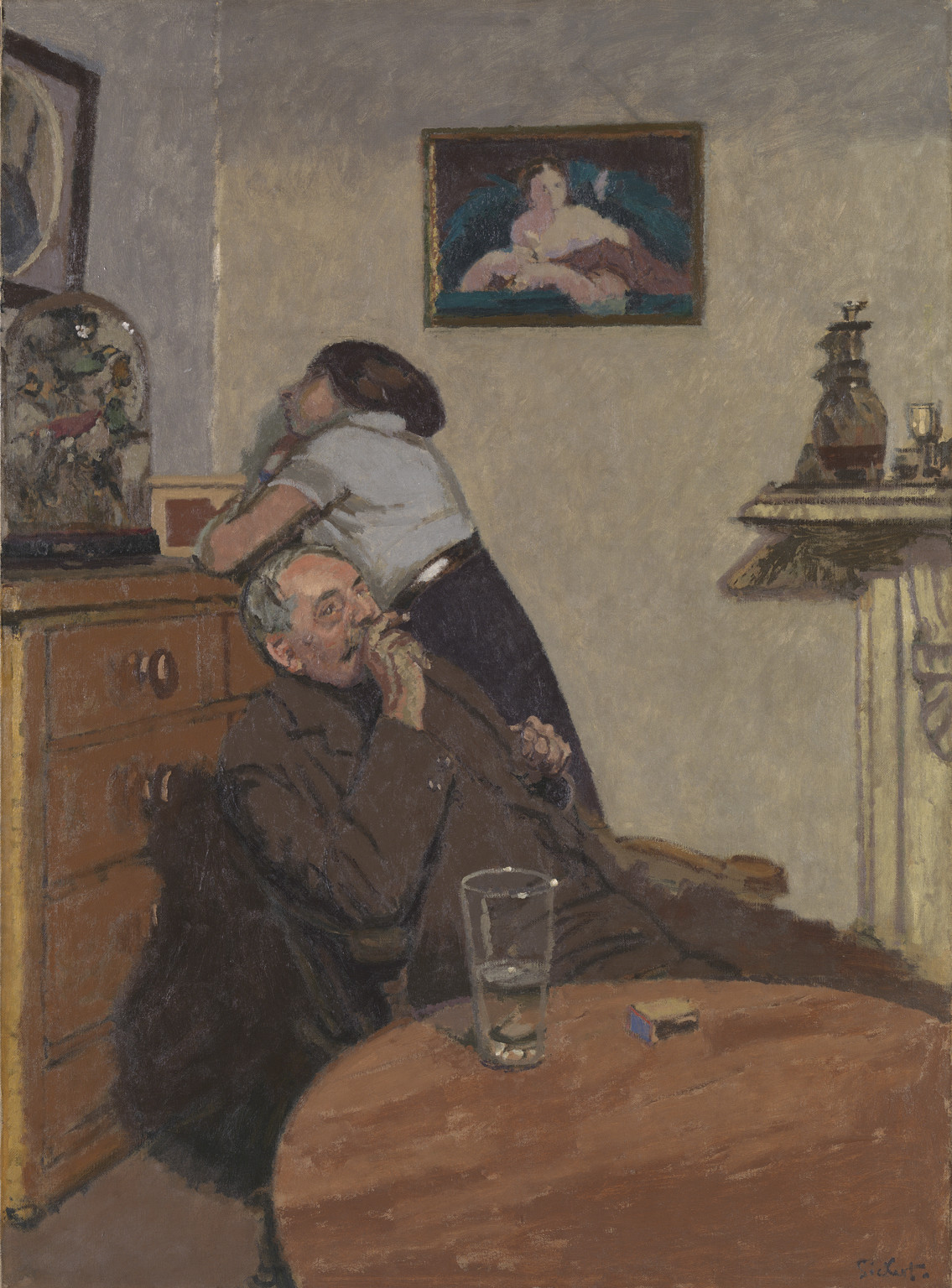
Ennui (1914), Tate Britain

== Late period ==
After the death of his second wife in 1920, Sickert relocated to Dieppe, where he painted scenes of casinos and café life until his return to London in 1922. In 1924, he was elected an Associate of the Royal Academy (ARA).

In 1926 he suffered an illness, thought to have been a minor stroke. In 1927, he abandoned his first name in favour of his middle name, and thereafter chose to be known as Richard Sickert. His style and subject matter also changed: Sickert stopped drawing, and instead painted from snapshots usually taken by his third wife, Thérèse Lessore, or from news photographs. The photographs were squared up for enlargement and transferred to canvas, with their pencil grids plainly visible in the finished paintings.

Seen by many of his contemporaries as evidence of the artist's decline, Sickert's late works are also his most forward-looking and prefigure the practices of Chuck Close and Gerhard Richter. Other paintings from Sickert's late period were adapted from illustrations by Victorian artists such as Georgie Bowers and John Gilbert. Sickert, separating these illustrations from their original context and painting them in poster-like colours so that the narrative and spatial intelligibility partly dissolved, called the resulting works his "English Echoes".

Sickert painted an informal portrait of Winston Churchill in about 1927. Churchill's wife Clementine introduced him to Sickert, who had been a friend of her family. The two men got along so well that Churchill, whose hobby was painting, wrote to his wife, "He is really giving me a new lease of life as a painter."

Sickert tutored and mentored students of the East London Group, and exhibited alongside them at The Lefevre Gallery in November 1929.

Sickert made his last etching in 1929.

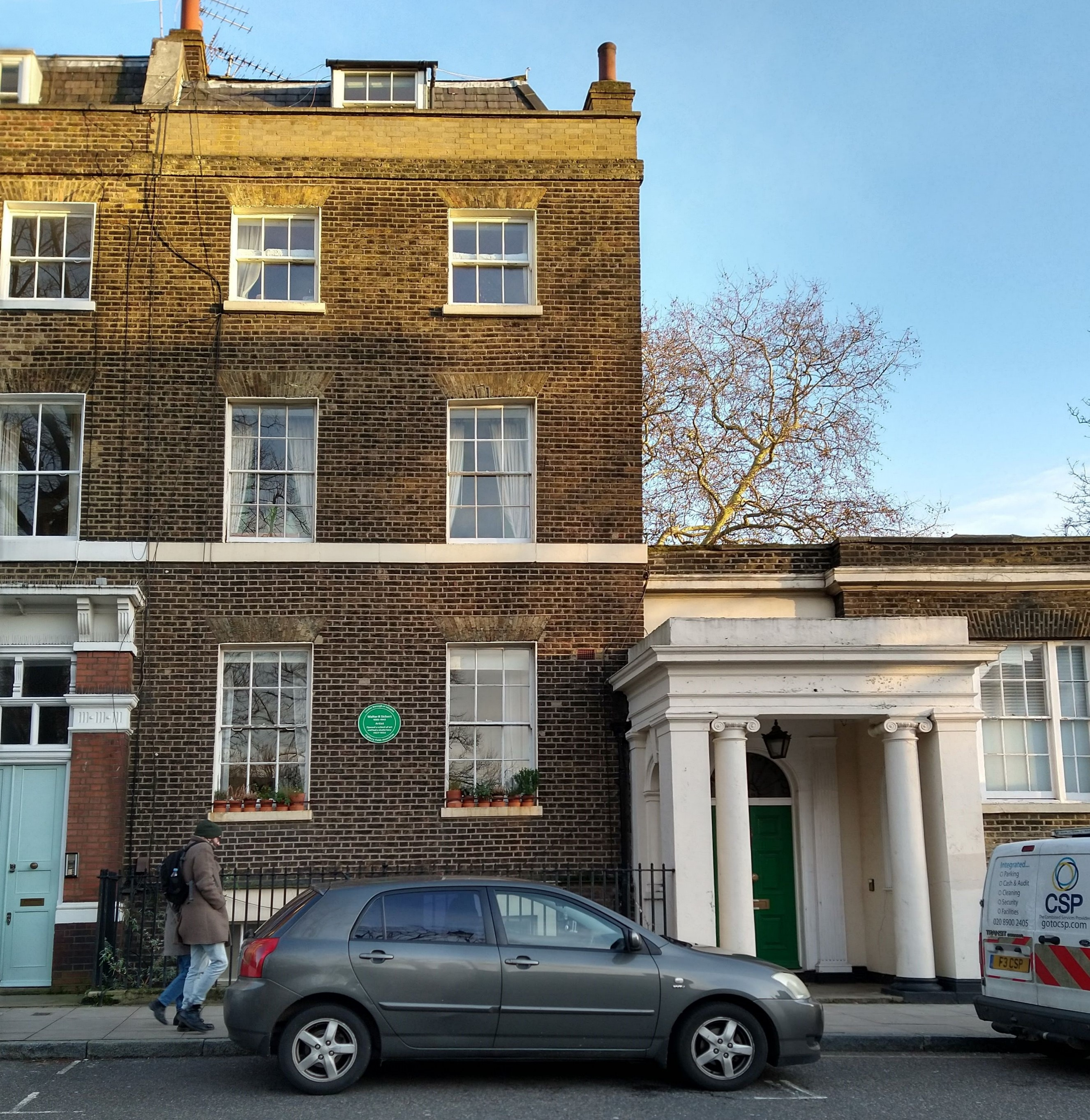
Sickert's former studio and school at 1 Highbury Place, Islington, London

Sickert was President of the Royal Society of British Artists from 1928 to 1930. He became a Royal Academician (RA) in March 1934 but resigned from the Academy on 9 May 1935 in protest against the president's refusal to support the preservation of Jacob Epstein's sculptural reliefs on the British Medical Association building in the Strand. In the last decade of his life, he depended increasingly on assistants, especially his wife, for the execution of his paintings.

One of Sickert's closest friends and supporters was newspaper baron Lord Beaverbrook, who accumulated the largest single collection of Sickert paintings in the world. This collection, along with a private correspondence between Sickert and Beaverbrook, is in the Beaverbrook Art Gallery in Fredericton, New Brunswick, Canada. In addition to having painted Beaverbrook, Sickert painted portraits of notables including Gwen Ffrangcon-Davies, Hugh Walpole, Valentine Browne, 6th Earl of Kenmare, and less formal depictions of Aubrey Beardsley, King George V, and Peggy Ashcroft.

== Personal life ==
Sickert married three times: to Ellen Melicent Cobden, a daughter of Richard Cobden from 1885 until their divorce in 1899; to Christine Angus from 1911 until she died in 1920; and to the painter Thérèse Lessore from 1926 until his death.

None of Sickert's marriages produced a child, but Sickert has been said to have had a son outside of marriage. In about 1904, he painted a portrait of a boy, called One of Madame Villain's Sons; Madame Augustine Villain was Sickert's landlady in Dieppe. The "artists Duncan Grant and Vanessa Bell, who bought the picture and knew Sickert well, were convinced the child was Maurice Villain, Sickert's own illegitimate son." "Later in his life, Maurice would insist that he was the son of the famous artist." Maurice Villain (1900-1977) wrote several books, including Unity: A History and Some Reflections (1961).

Sickert's sister was Helena Swanwick, a feminist and pacifist active in the women's suffrage movement. His younger brother, Bernard Sickert (1863–1932), was also a professional artist.

== Death ==
Sickert died in Bath, Somerset in 1942, at the age of 81. He had spent much time in the city in his later years, and many of his paintings depict Bath's varied street scenes. He is buried in the churchyard of the Church of St Nicholas, Bathampton.

== Style and subjects ==
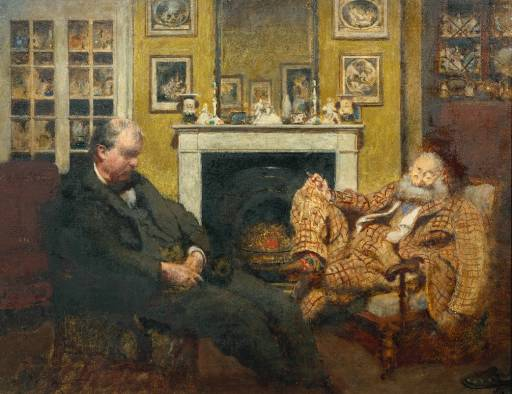
Henry Tonks. Sodales: Mr Steer and Mr Sickert, 1930

For his earliest paintings, Sickert followed Whistler's practice of rapid, wet-in-wet execution using very fluid paint. He subsequently adopted a more deliberate procedure of painting pictures in multiple stages, and "attached a great deal of importance to what he called the 'cooking' side of painting". He preferred to paint not from nature but from drawings or, after the mid-1920s, from photographs or from popular prints by Victorian illustrators. After transferring the design to canvas by the use of a grid, Sickert made a rapid underpainting using two colours, which was allowed to dry thoroughly before the final colours were applied. He experimented tirelessly with the details of his method, always with the goal, according to his biographer Wendy Baron, of "paint[ing] quickly, in about two sittings, with the maximum economy and minimum of fuss".

Sickert tended to paint his subjects in series. He is identified particularly with domestic interior scenes, scenes of Venice, music hall and theatre scenes, and portraits. He painted few still lifes. For his music hall subjects, Sickert often chose complex and ambiguous points of view, so that the spatial relationship between the audience, performer, and orchestra becomes confused, as figures gesture into space and others are reflected in mirrors. The isolated rhetorical gestures of singers and actors seem to reach out to no one in particular, and audience members are portrayed stretching and peering to see things that lie beyond the visible space. This theme of confused or failed communication between people appears frequently in his art. By emphasising the patterns of wallpaper and architectural decorations, Sickert created abstract decorative arabesques and flattened the three-dimensional space. His music hall pictures, like Degas' paintings of dancers and café-concert entertainers, connect the artificiality of art itself to the conventions of theatrical performance and painted backdrops.

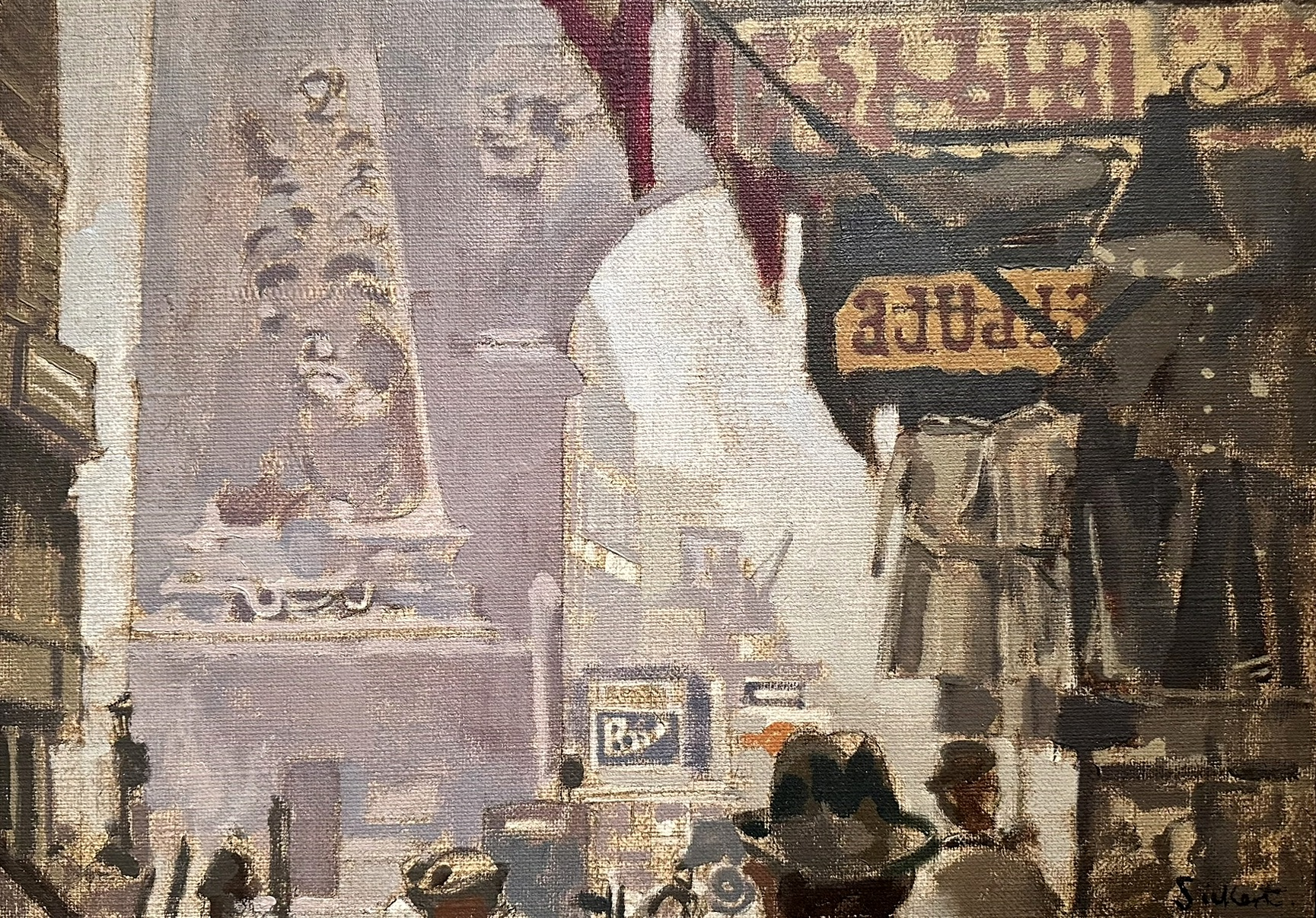
Ludovico Magno (1930), The Phillips Collection

Sickert often professed his distaste for what he termed the "beastly" character of thickly textured paint. In an article he wrote for The Fortnightly Review in 1911, he described his reaction to the paintings of Van Gogh: "I execrate his treatment of the instrument I love, these strips of metallic paint that catch the light like so many dyed straws ... my teeth are set on edge". In response to Alfred Wolmark's work he declared that "thick oil-paint is the most undecorative matter in the world".

Nonetheless, Sickert's paintings of the Camden Town Murder series of c. 1906–1909 were painted in heavy impasto and narrow tonal range, as were numerous other obese nudes in the pre-World War I period in which the fleshiness of the figures is connected to the thickness of the paint—a device that was later adapted by Lucian Freud. The influence of these paintings on successive generations of British artists has been noted in the works of Freud, David Bomberg, Francis Bacon, Frank Auerbach, Howard Hodgkin, and Leon Kossoff.

In the 1910s and 1920s, the dark, gloomy tones of his early paintings gradually brightened, and Sickert juxtaposed unexpected tones with a new boldness in works such as Brighton Pierrots (1915) and Portrait of Victor Lecourt (1921–1924). His several self-portraits usually displayed an element of role-playing consistent with his early career as an actor: Lazarus Breaks his Fast (c. 1927) and The Domestic Bully (c. 1935–1938) are examples. Sickert's late works display his preference for thinly scrubbed veils of paint, described by Helen Lessore as "a cool colour rapidly brushed over a warm underpainting (or vice versa) on a coarse canvas and in a restricted range allow[ing] the undercoat to 'grin through'".

Sickert insisted on the importance of subject matter in art, saying that "all the greater draughtsmen tell a story", but treated his subjects in a detached manner. Max Kozloff wrote: "How not to say too much seems to have become a matter of utmost laborious concern for Sickert", as evidenced by his paintings' studied lack of finish and "neurasthenic sobriety" of color. According to the painter Frank Auerbach, "Sickert's detachment became increasingly evident in his uninhibited procedures. He made obvious his frequent reliance on snapshots and press photographs, he copied, used and took over the work of other, dead, artists and made extensive use, also, of the services of his assistants who played a large and increasing part in the production of his work."

== Jack the Ripper ==
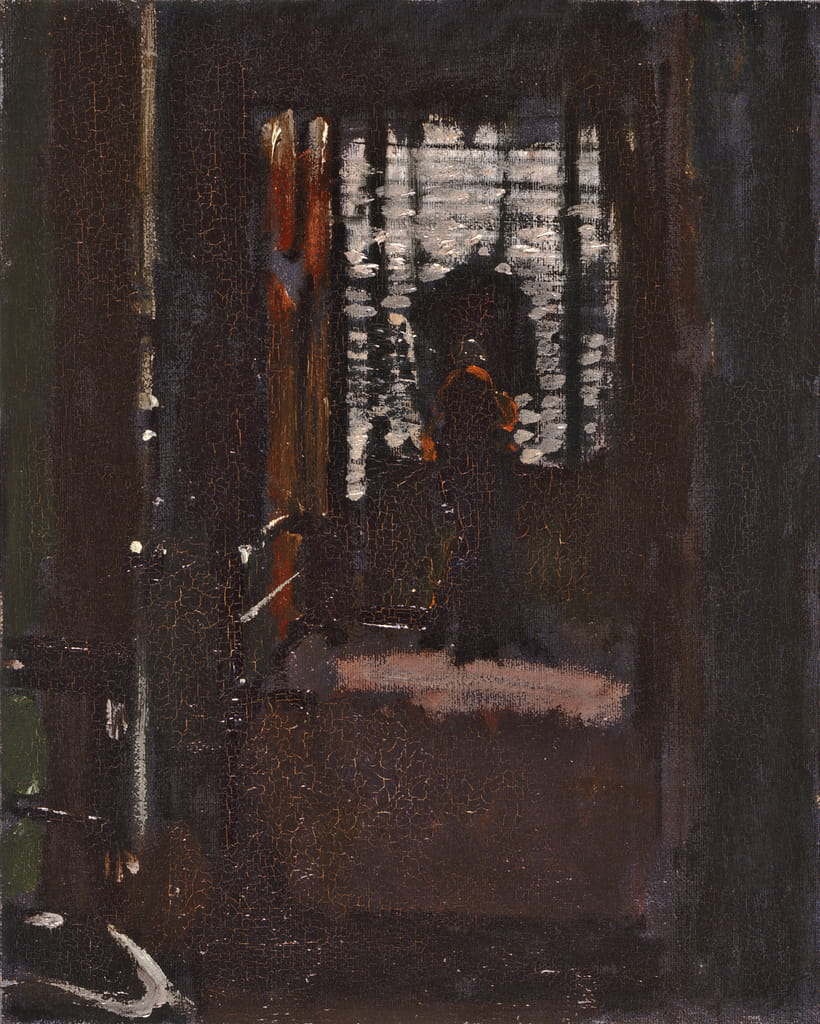
Jack the Ripper's Bedroom, c. 1907

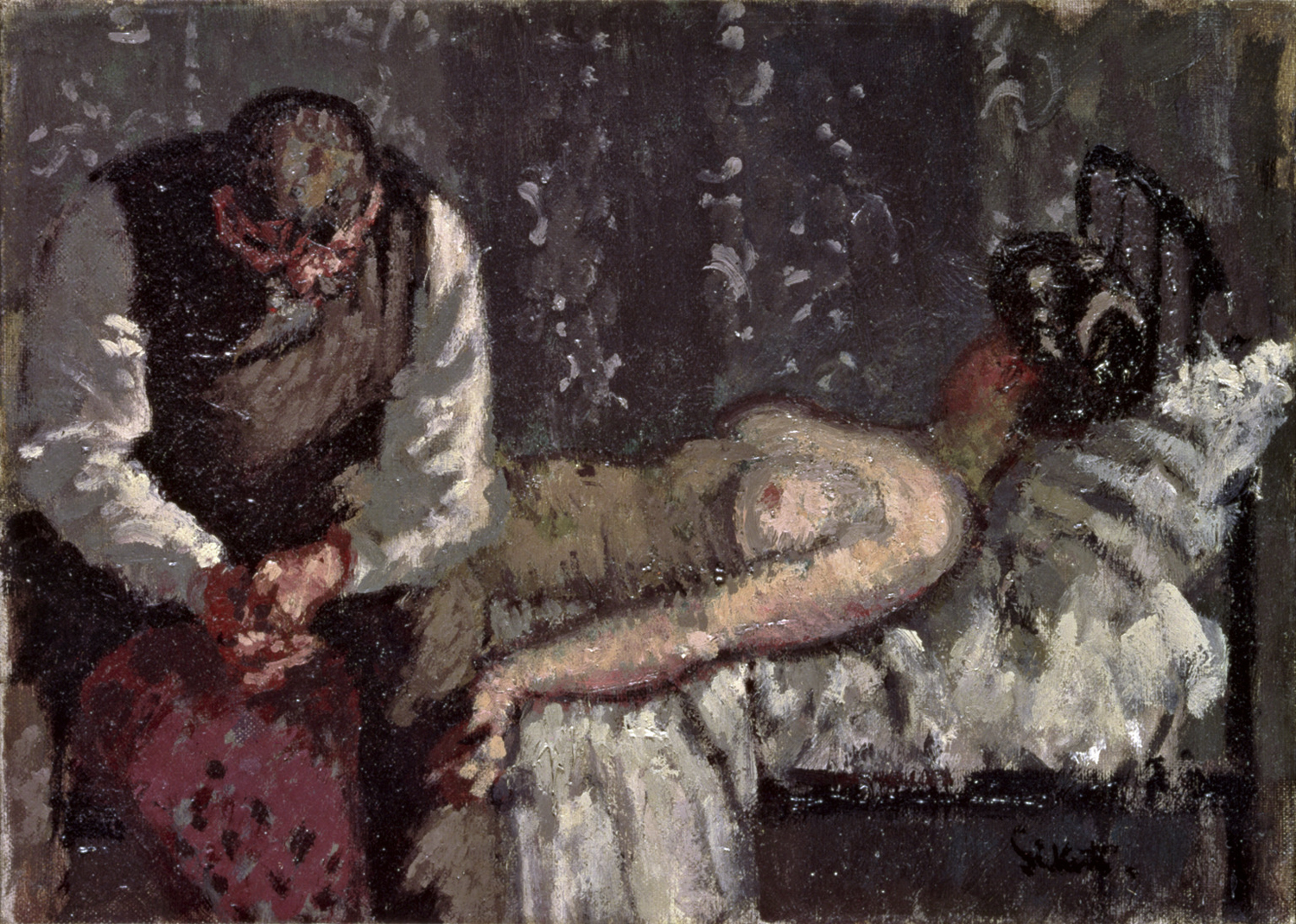
Walter Sickert, The Camden Town Murder, originally titled, What Shall We Do for the Rent?, alternatively, What Shall We Do to Pay the Rent, 1908

Sickert took a keen interest in the crimes of Jack the Ripper and believed he had lodged in a room used by the notorious serial killer. He had been told this by his landlady, who suspected a previous lodger who stayed there in 1881. Sickert did a painting of the room in 1905–1907 and titled it Jack the Ripper's Bedroom (Manchester Art Gallery). It shows a dark, melancholy room with most details obscured.

Although for over 80 years there was no mention of Sickert's being a suspect in the Ripper crimes, some authors have explored the idea that Sickert was Jack the Ripper or his accomplice. Sickert is not considered a serious suspect by most who study the case, and strong evidence shows he spent most of 1888 outside the UK and was in France at the time of most of the Ripper murders.

== Personal papers ==
Walter Sickert's personal papers are held at Islington Local History Centre. Additional papers are held at several other archives, particularly the Tate Gallery Archive. The Walker Art Gallery holds the largest collection of his drawings, a total of 348.

== Retrospectives ==
In 2021–2022, a retrospective exhibition Sickert: A Life in Art at the Walker Art Gallery, Liverpool, displayed around 100 of Sickert's paintings and 200 drawings, claiming to be the largest retrospective of the artist's work to have been held in the UK for more than 30 years. The art critic Jonathan Jones noted: "This baffling man who was born in Munich in 1860, emigrated to Britain as a child and became one of our greatest and weirdest artists, emerges in this excellent show as even odder than I thought. In that unsettling way of seeing lies his modernity."

From 28 April to 18 September 2022, Tate Britain staged the first major Sickert retrospective at Tate in over 60 years, featuring over 150 of his works from over 70 public and private collections, and claiming to be the most extensive retrospective in almost 30 years. The exhibition was organised in collaboration with the Petit Palais, Paris, where it is expected to be displayed between late 2022 and 2023. Jonathan Jones observed, "This hellishly brilliant exhibition takes you to a place beyond simple moral or political truth. Whatever Sickert was, he was the only British artist of his time who can be as powerful as Munch, Van Gogh or Otto Dix."

== Gallery ==
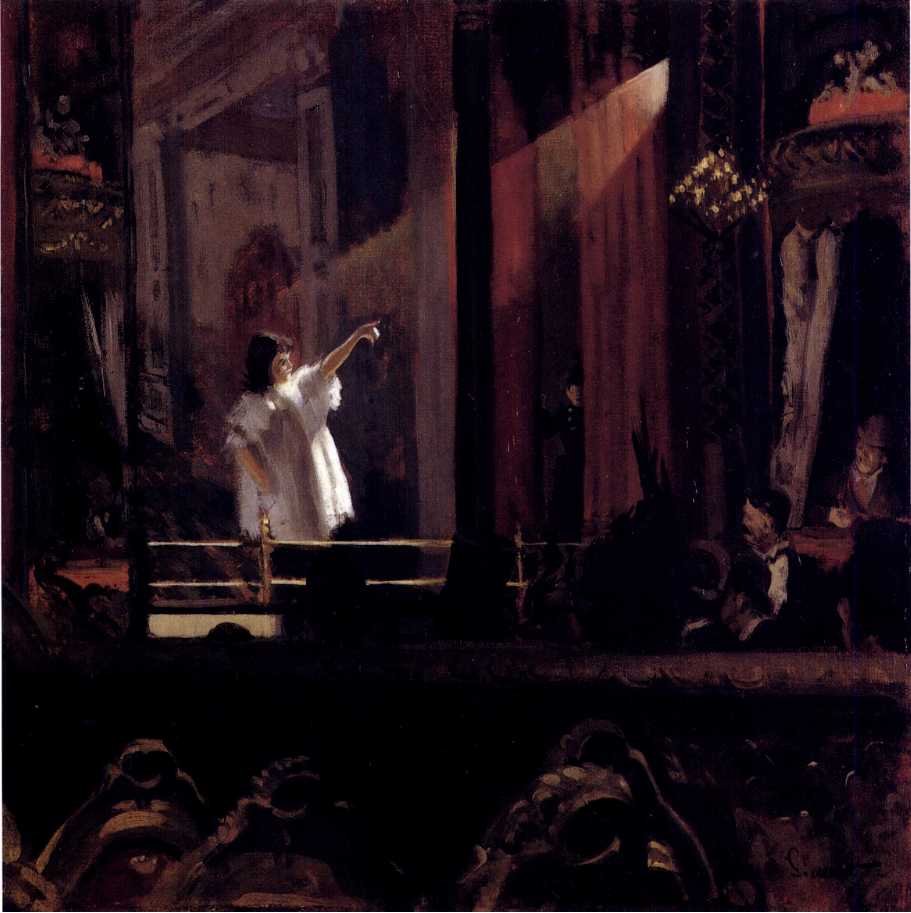
Little Dot Hetherington at the Old Bedford, 1889

Café des Tribunaux, Dieppe, 1890

Corner of St Mark's, Venice, 1901

Noctes ambrosianae, 1907

Soldiers of King Albert at the Ready, 1914

The Integrity of Belgium, 1914

Queen's Road Station, Bayswater, 1916

London Street, Bath, 1941

== See also ==
- Elwin Hawthorne – artist, worked for a period as Sickert's assistant
- Florence Pash – artist, ran a private art school with Sickert in the mid-1890s

== Bibliography ==
- Baron, Wendy (1972). Sickert. London: Phaidon Press Ltd.
- Baron, Wendy (1979). The Camden Town Group. London: Scolar Press.
- Baron, Wendy (September 1980). "The Perversity of Walter Sickert". Arts Magazine. pp. 125–29.
- Baron, Wendy and Shone, Richard, eds. (1992). Sickert: Paintings ("Catalogue of the exhibition held at the Royal Academy of Arts, London, from November 1992 to February 1993".) New Haven and London: Yale University Press. ISBN 0-300-05373-8 (cloth), ISBN 0-300-05395-9 (paper). With essays by Richard Shone, Anna Gruetzner Robins, and Patrick O'Connor.
- Baron, Wendy (2006). Sickert: Paintings and Drawings. Yale University Press, 2006.
- Bromberg, Ruth (2000). Walter Sickert, Prints: A Catalogue Raisonné. Paul Mellon Centre for Studies in British Art.
- Browse, Lillian, ed. (1943). Sickert, with an essay on his life and notes on his paintings; and with an essay on his art by R. H. Wilenski. London: Faber and Faber.
- Browse, Lillian (1960). Sickert. London: Rupert Hart-Davis.
- Chambers, Emma, ed. (2022). Walter Sickert. Tate, accompanying a Tate Britain exhibition.
- Corbett, David Peters (2001). Walter Sickert. Princeton, NJ: Princeton University Press.
- Emmons, Robert (1941). The Life and Opinions of Walter Richard Sickert. London: Faber and Faber, Ltd.
- Hartley, Cathy. "Gosse, (Laura) Sylvia (1881–1968)". A Historical Dictionary of British Women. London and New York: Europa Publications, 2003 (rev. ed. of The Europa Biographical Dictionary of British Women, 1983).
- Keenan McDonald, Charlotte (2021). Sickert: A Life in Art. National Museums Liverpool: Walker Art Gallery. Exhibition catalog.
- Lilly, Marjorie (1973). Sickert: The Painter and His Circle. Park Ridge, NJ: Noyes Press. Lilly (1891–1980) was a painter who exhibited with and was influenced by Sickert
- Moorby, Nicola (2012). "Walter Richard Sickert 1860–1942," artist biography, May 2006, in Helena Bonett, Ysanne Holt, Jennifer Mundy, eds. The Camden Town Group in Context, Tate
- Michael Parkin Fine Art Ltd. and The Maltzahn Gallery Ltd. (1974). The Sickert Women and the Sickert Girls: Walter Sickert with Therese Lessore, Sylvia Gosse, Wendela Boreel, Marjorie Lilly, Christiana Cutter: 18 April to 18 May 1974. London: Parkin Gallery.
- Robins, Anna Gruetzner and Thomson, Richard (2005). Degas, Sickert, and Toulouse-Lautrec: London and Paris, 1870–1910. London: Tate Publishing. (Catalog for 2005–2006 Tate Britain exhibition listed below under External links)
- Robins, Anna Gruetzner. "Walter Sickert: Art Critic for the New Age" (includes links to nine of Sickert's reviews for the New Age).
- Robins, Anna Gruetzner, ed. (2000), Walter Sickert: The Complete Writings on Art. New York: Oxford University Press. ISBN 0198172257
- Rough, Billy (September 2021). "'Matisse has all the worst art-school tricks' – Sickert's trash talk". National Museums Liverpool.
- Rough, Billy (April 2022a). "The much-abused apostle of Music Hall art: Sickert and the stage". In Chambers, Emma (ed.). Walter Sickert (1 ed.). Tate Publishing. pp. 80–83. ISBN 9781849768214.
- Rough, Billy (May 2022b). "The art of murder: the strange case of Walter Sickert and Jack the Ripper". Fortean Times. No. 419. pp. 28–35.
- Rough, Billy (10 March 2023). "New questions about Sickert's 'Vesta Victoria at the Old Bedford'". The Burlington Magazine. Vol. 165, no. 1440. pp. 305–307.
- Rough, Billy (November 2009). "Sickert's Mirror: Reflecting duality, identity and performance c.1890". The British Art Journal. X (3): 138–144.
- Rough, William (May 2012). "Walter Sickert and Contemporary Drama". In Bonett, Helena; Holt, Ysanne; Mundy, Jennifer (eds.). The Camden Town Group in Context. Tate Publishing. ISBN 978-1-84976-385-1.
- Shone, Richard; Curtis, Penelope (1988). W. R. Sickert: Drawings and Paintings 1890–1942. Liverpool: Tate Gallery. ISBN 1-85437-008-1
- Shone, Richard (1988). Walter Sickert. Oxford: Phaidon.
- Shone, Richard (2021). Sickert: The Theatre of Life. Piano Nobile, 2021.
- Sickert, Walter; Hollis, Marianne, Hayward Gallery, Sainsbury Centre for Visual Arts & Wolverhampton Art Gallery (1981). Late Sickert: Paintings 1927 to 1942. London: Arts Council of Great Britain. ISBN 0-7287-0301-7
- Sickert, Walter (November 1917). "Memories of Degas," in The Painter of Modern Life: Memories of Degas by George Moore and Walter Sickert, with an introduction by Anna Gruetzner Robins. London: Pallas Athene, 2011. ISBN 978-1-84368-080-2. Reprinted in Sitwell, Osbert, ed. A Free House!.
- Sickert, Walter (21 July 1910). "The naked and the Nude". New Age, 21 July 1910, pp. 276–7. Reprinted in Robins, Anna Gruetzner, ed. Walter Sickert: The Complete Writings on Art, Oxford University Press, 2000, p. 261. Also reprinted in Sitwell, Osbert, ed. A Free House!, p. 323. See commentary under Wright, Barnaby, below.
- Sitwell, Osbert, ed. (1947). A Free House! Or the Artist as Craftsman: Being the Writings of Walter Richard Sickert London: Macmillan & Co. (reprinted by Arcade Press, 2012, consulting editor Deborah Rosenthal.)
- Soames, Mary, ed. (1999). Winston and Clementine: The Personal Letters of the Churchills. New York: Houghton Mifflin Company. ISBN 0-618-08251-4 (pbk)
- Sturgis, Matthew (2005). Walter Sickert: A Life. Comprehensive biography of Sickert – in the final chapter Sturgis refutes the notion that Sickert was Jack the Ripper, but also claims that if Sickert were still alive he would enjoy his current notoriety.
- Tickner, Lisa (2000). "Walter Sickert: The Camden Town Murder and Tabloid Crime", in Tickner, Lisa, Modern Life & Modern Subjects: British Art in the Early Twentieth Century. New Haven, Connecticut: Yale University Press, 2000, pp. 11–47.
- Travers, Matthew (2021). Walter Sickert: The Theatre of Life. London: Piano Nobile.
- Upstone, Robert (2008). Modern Painters: The Camden Town Group, exhibition catalogue, Tate Britain, London, 2008 ISBN 1-85437-781-7
- Upstone, Robert (2009). Sickert in Venice, exhibition catalogue, Dulwich Picture Gallery, ISBN 978-1-85759-583-3
- Wilcox, T., Causey, A., Checketts, L., Peppiatt, M., Manchester City Art Gallery, Barbican Art Gallery, & Glasgow Art Gallery and Museum (1990). The Pursuit of the Real: British Figurative Painting from Sickert to Bacon. London: Lund Humphries in association with Manchester City Art Galleries. ISBN 0-85331-571-X
- Woolf, Virginia (1934). "Walter Sickert: A Conversation". Also published as "Walter Sickert" in The Captain's Death Bed and Other Essays, Woolf, Leonard, ed. London: Hogarth Press, 1950. ISBN 978-0-7012-0456-3. First American edition published by Harcourt, Brace and Company, New York, 1950.
- Wright, Barnaby. "Walter Sickert: 'The naked and the Nude'" (about Sickert's article of that name listed above).
