= Lefevre Gallery =

Art gallery in London, England (1926–2002)

Coordinates: 51.5069°N 0.1365°W

- Type: Art Gallery
- Founded: 1926 in London, England
- Founders: Alexander Reid; Ernest Lefevre
- Defunct: 2002
- Fate: Dissolved
- Successor: Lefevre Fine Art
- Headquarters: London, England

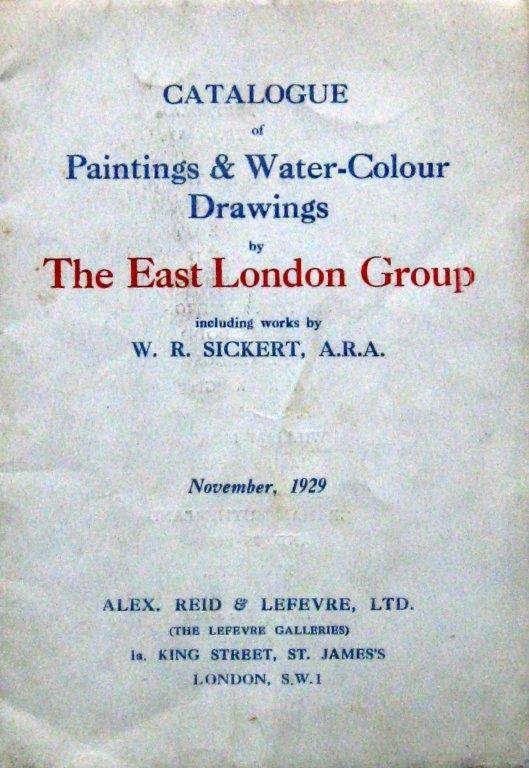
Catalogue for the Gallery's November 1929 exhibition of works by the East London Group, "including works by W.R. Sickert, A.R.A."

The Lefevre Gallery (or The Lefevre Galleries) was an art gallery in London, England, operated by Alex. Reid & Lefevre Ltd.

The gallery was opened at 1a, King Street, St James's, in 1926, when rival art dealers Alexander Reid and Ernest Lefevre joined forces.

Upon Reid's death in 1928, his son, A J McNeill Reid succeeded him. Lefevre resigned in 1931.

In 1950, the gallery relocated to premises at 30, Bruton Street, Mayfair.

Among artists whose first British solo exhibitions were hosted by the gallery were Salvador Dalí, Edgar Degas, André Derain, L. S. Lowry, Amedeo Modigliani, Henri Rousseau, Gregorio Prieto and Georges Seurat, It also held the first London exhibitions for Bernard Buffet, Balthus and René Magritte. Others who exhibited there included Francis Bacon, Lucian Freud, Walter Sickert, Wyndham Lewis, and the East London Group.

The gallery closed in 2002, citing competition from auction houses, changes in tax on works imported from outside the European Union, and the introduction of droit de suite (royalties paid to artists when their work is sold). The name lives on as 'Lefevre Fine Art' founded the same year.
