= Little Dot Hetherington at the Old Bedford =

1888–1889 painting by English artist Walter Sickert

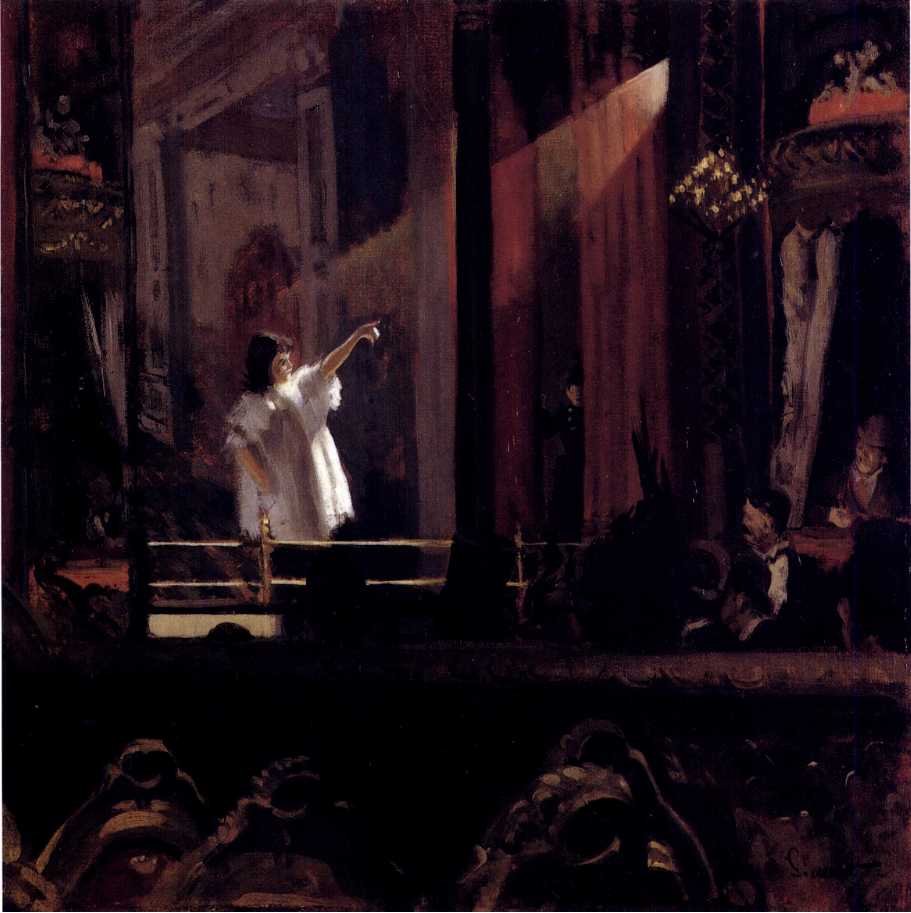
- Artist: Walter Sickert
- Year: 1888–1889
- Medium: Oil on canvas
- Dimensions: 61 cm × 61 cm (24 in × 24 in)
- Location: Private Collection of Hamilton Emmons, Monte Carlo, Monaco

Little Dot Hetherington at the Old Bedford or The Boy I Love is Up in the Gallery, in some cases, the painting is referred to as Joe Haynes and Little Dot Hetherington at the Old Bedford Music Hall, is an oil on canvas painting by British Post-Impressionist painter Walter Richard Sickert, from 1888–1889. The canvas is in a private collection in Monte Carlo.

Little Dot Hetherington at the Old Bedford belongs to the early period of Walter Sickert's work, when he was influenced by his acquaintance with the French Impressionist Edgar Degas. It depicts the performance of a young singer, known as Dot Hetherington, at the Old Bedford Music Hall in London in November 1888. The theme, an artist's power over the feelings and thoughts of the audience, and individual motifs, such as the depiction of the scene not directly but as a reflection in mirrors, from Dot Hetherington's Babes in Old Bedford, were motifs the artist repeatedly explored in his later works of the late 1880s and 1890s. This painting is believed to be the first in Sickert's oeuvre to feature reflections in mirrors.

Walter Sickert subsequently reproduced Little Dot Hetherington at the Old Bedford as a fan painting and as a lithograph. Art historians at the Walker Art Gallery in Liverpool, along with other researchers, argue that the painting of Old Bedford in its collection is paired with Tiny Dot Hetherington. For nearly 150 years, the painting has drawn the attention of art historians, cultural historians, and scholars of Victorian Britain and British musical theatre. It has been exhibited numerous times at prestigious national and international exhibitions.

== History ==
=== Walter Sickert ===
By 1888, under the influence of Edgar Degas, Walter Sickert had developed his own version of impressionism, characterized by a rather gloomy palette. Sickert painted in the studio, working from sketches made from life and memory, perceiving his art as an escape from the "tyranny of nature". Between 1887 and 1892, in a significant series of paintings depicting the music hall, Sickert explored themes central to his work: the actress on stage, the interaction between performer and audience, and unconventional angles under artificial lighting. Anna Grunzner Robins noted that, when working on scenes set in the interior of a music hall, Sickert typically attended performances and took a seat in the fourth row from the back of the parterre. Following the practices of Edgar Degas —whose influence Sickert acknowledged in the preface to the catalogue of the Impressionist exhibition he organized in London in 1889— he created small pencil sketches of performers, musicians, and audience. (Note: Another characterisation of the artist's work on sketches is given by Patricia Cornwell: "When Sickert sat in the music hall, right next to the stage [!] and made his sketches, he was far from perfecting his technique. He drew heads separated from necks, arms without hands, a torso without arms, naked thighs, a torso without limbs with breasts protruding from deep necklines"-) These sketches served as the foundation and references for the intricate oil paintings he later completed in his studio.

In 1888, Walter Sickert joined the New English Art Club, which positioned itself in opposition to the conservative Royal Academy of Arts. The club comprised artists who had worked in France and were influenced by contemporary trends there. Sickert's first acclaimed works, created in the late 1880s, depicted scenes from London's music halls. However, his canvases often faced rejection from art critics of the time, who accused them of being ugly and vulgar. This criticism stemmed largely from the subject matter, as Victorian public opinion equated music hall actresses with prostitutes. (Note: In the late 20th century, Sickert was repeatedly suspected of the murders of prostitutes between August and November 1888, which were attributed to the never-exposed serial killer known as Jack the Ripper. In particular, such suspicions were raised by Stephen Knight in his book Jack the Ripper: The Final Conclusion, Jean Overton Fuller in her book Sickert and the Ripper's Crimes. In the early 20th century, accusations against Sickert for the murders of 1888 and 1907 were made by novelist and crime writer Patricia Cornwell in her books Jack the Ripper. Who is he? Portrait of a Murderer and The Ripper: The Secret Life of Walter Sickert.)

=== Historical representation ===
The location of Tiny Dot Hetherington at the Old Bedford is the Old Bedford Music Hall, situated at 93–95 High Street in the London borough of Camden Town. By the late 19th and early 20th centuries, Camden, with its canals and railway, was regarded by many as a relatively prosperous area. The neighborhood housed affluent citizens and skilled workers employed in newly established factories, including those producing pianos, which lent the area a distinctly musical character. The Old Bedford Music Hall was built in 1861. However, British cultural historian and University of Edinburgh professor Christopher Brouard has described Camden at the time as a poor, working-class neighborhood that was dysfunctional and unsafe.

For Walter Sickert, the bright and colorful music halls were a microcosm of modern life — a mirror of the bustling metropolis. He had a deep passion for theatrical performances, having briefly worked as an actor himself. Sickert often dressed in stage costumes, adopting what he believed to be different personalities. He first visited the Old Bedford Music Hall in 1885, later referring to it as "my old love". The venue allowed him to blend seamlessly with the crowd, while the close proximity of the audience to the stage enabled him to observe his favorite performers up close. Sickert's paintings and sketches capture the interior of the auditorium, including its mirrors, decorations, performances, and audience. Among these works is the painting titled Tiny Dot Hetherington at the Old Bedford. The modern theater that Sickert painted, with its large gilt mirrors, gas lamps, and orange-and-blue color scheme, was demolished in 1898 to make way for the construction of the New Bedford Music Hall. In the 1910s, the New Bedford became a favorite haunt of the artists known as the Camden Town Group, including Walter Sickert. The New Bedford Music Hall was also frequented by writer Virginia Woolf, and Charlie Chaplin performed there. By 1929, a young Peter Sellers was living above the theater while his mother performed on the music hall stage. By the time Sellers began his career as an entertainer, the halls were only half-full, as audiences were increasingly drawn to film, television, and radio over live performances. The New Bedford Music Hall finally closed in 1959, and a decade later, its building was demolished.

A little singer (Little Dot Hetherington) stands on the stage of a music hall during a performance of the song The Boy I Love is Up in the Gallery, which was popular in the second half of the 1880s. The girl points with her hand toward the gallery — the top tier of the auditorium, where the cheapest seats are located. There sits the object of her affection. The spectator views the scene from the auditorium, their gaze directed over the parterre seats and past the Benoir box on the right. It is generally believed that the viewer does not see Dot Hetherington herself in the painting, but only her reflection in one of the large mirrors that adorned the interior of the music hall. The audience depicted in the painting are also reflections in these mirrors.

The artist highlights the fragility of the young singer's "little white figure". Wendy Baron observed that, with the exception of the woman in the large feathered bonnet, the audience for the performance is entirely male. Sickert depicted the audience with attention to their social differences, age, and occupation — for instance, some wear top hats, while others wear only mobcaps. Baron also noted that, in 1885, an editorial on the front page of the Pall Mall Gazette brought public attention to the exploitation of underage prostitutes in Britain. The ensuing scandal led to the legal age of sexual consent being raised from 13 to 15.The researcher emphasized that the male figures in Little Dot Hetherington at the Old Bedford appear far more sinister than the idealized "boy in love" referenced in the song sung by the girl, a detail reflected in the painting's later title.

William Rough, PhD in art history, believed that the painting was an attempt by the artist to convey the power the young singer was gaining over the auditorium as she performed. He noted that the music hall building was cramped and unassuming, and mirrors were installed to create the illusion of a larger space. In the background of the painting, on the right, a male figure watches the girl on stage from backstage. Wendy Baron speculated that this could be an adult accompanying the girl to the performance or the next performer waiting for his turn. There is also a man seated in a box near the stage. This figure, like the girl, is reflected in a second mirror located at the far left of the composition (outside the canvas itself) and then repeated in the right-hand mirror. Rough argued that this use of reflections balanced the painting's symmetry while also "upsetting the balance" of reality and illusion as perceived by the audience. British artist and art historian Eric Shanes observed that Sickert's use of mirrors forced viewers to question both the reality depicted in the painting and the nature of reality itself.

The technique of Little Dot Hetherington at the Old Bedford is oil on canvas, with dimensions of 61 × 61 cm. The artist's signature, Siskert, is located in the lower right-hand corner.

=== Provenance and exhibitions ===
The painting was purchased at Christie's on 28 March 1930 by Dr. Robert Emmons (1894–1963), an admirer of the artist. The Art News reported that it was bought for 520 guineas. The painting is currently held in the private collection of Emmons' heir, Hamilton Emmons, in Monte Carlo. However, Eric Shanes identified another collector, Jeoffrey Verdon-Roe, as the owner of the painting.

Dr. Robert Emmons, a friend and pupil of Walter Sickert, was an American with a private medical practice in London during the 1920s. Over time, painting evolved from a hobby into a profession for him. In October 1927, he enrolled at the Sickert School of Art, located at 1 Highbury Place in Islington. Emmons gained recognition as a painter, exhibiting his work at the Royal Academy of Arts in 1928 and 1932. He was also the author of The Life and Opinions of Walter Richard Sickert, the first biography of the artist, published in 1941 — the year before Sickert's death. Additionally, Emmons was an avid collector of Sickert's works and frequently lent paintings from his collection to Sickert's solo exhibitions.

The painting Little Dot Hetherington at the Old Bedford was exhibited during Walter Sickert's lifetime. In December 1889, it was shown at the London Impressionists exhibition. A review in Igdrasil magazine commented:

"We expected more from Francis Bate and Walter Sickert than they have given us. The former's Christchurch, Hunts is very good, and Tiny Dot Hetherington is the most uncompromising [work in the exhibition], but we would have liked to have seen a better example of the work of both of these gifted men".

In contrast, The Star newspaper praised the work, stating:

"[Walter Sickert's] music-halls are the greatest possible breakthrough compared with what he has hitherto shown".

In July 1894, the English quarterly magazine The Yellow Book featured a reproduction of Little Dot Hetherington at the Old Bedford under the title The Old Bedford Music Hall. It appeared alongside two other reproductions of Sickert's works: Portrait of Aubrey Beardsley and Ada Lundberg.

The painting was also exhibited at the Elbert Jan van Wisselingh Gallery in 1895, where, for the first time, the title of the song The Boy I Love is Up in the Gallery was added to the familiar title of the painting. It was later displayed at the Leicester Galleries in 1929 and again in 1950. After Sickert's death, the painting was featured in several prominent exhibitions. In 1960, it was included in an exhibition organized by the Agnew Gallery titled Old Bedford. That same year, it was shown in the Arts Council of Great Britain exhibition at the Tate Gallery. The painting was also displayed in 1977–1978, in Washington in 1980, and at the Royal Academy of Arts in 1992–1993.

== Description ==
=== Characters ===
Little Dot Hetherington at the Old Bedford' is Sickert's earliest painting of the Old Bedford, with which his name became closely associated. The Old Bedford in Camden Town was an old-fashioned music hall. It was cramped by the standards of the glittering West End halls of its day, but, like the fashionable interiors of the time, it was decorated with huge mirrors. When the painting was first exhibited in December 1889, the little singer in the picture was identified by Sickert himself as Dot Hetherington, a little-known young artist who had been introduced to the public as the Taglioni child (in honour of Marie Taglioni, a French ballerina who died in 1884). She copied Mary Lloyd in her dress and on-stage manner. It was Lloyd who brought widespread fame to the song The Boy I Love is Up in the Galley, sung by the little singer in Sickert's painting.

William Rough wrote that the designation of the singer in the painting's title as Little suggests that Dot is a girl, or, more likely in his view, a young woman posing as a girl in her role. Rough noted that very little is known about Dot's life, but she did perform at the Old Bedford on 24 November 1888, when Joe Hines (another character identified in the painting) was present.

An anonymous arts critic for Theatre Magazine wrote in a review in February 1889: "Among those whom I would call the most promising children must be Miss Dot Hetherington as Goudy, a charming little actress, singer and dancer". Punch magazine in January 1889 printed an enthusiastic review by an audience member of Dot Hetherington's dancing performance as Goody in the play. He wrote that his little Sybil 'said he wished he could kiss her' and recommended that all young audiences see a performance of Goody's Little Shoes. (Note: In a story by the writer Paul West, Walter Sickert, walking through a London gripped by fear of Jack the Ripper, recalls a Dot Hetherington song he heard at a music hall performance. It may have encouraged his companion on the walk, Mary Kelly.) Victorian literature professor Anne Varty discovered that one of Dot's earlier roles was in the 1886 musical production of Alice in Wonderland, which combined the plots of both of Lewis Carroll's Alice stories. The girl appeared as Dot Alberti in the scene with the Walrus and the Carpenter, alongside future actress and memoirist Isa Bowman. Both played the ghosts of the oysters. Dot in this role is also mentioned by Lewis Carroll himself in his diary.

The use of the word little in her stage name, according to Wendy Baron, referred to her youth (no older than 12 or 13), not her height. In the late 19th century, girls were a standard feature of the music hall programme. They sang love songs as well as comic songs with hints of innocence and experience. One contemporary described a performance by "two beautiful girls, developed beyond their years, singing with a charming naivety... about beauties and being deceived".

Anna Grützner Robins has suggested (based on information from Hetherington's granddaughter) that Dot's real name was Florence Louise Hetherington (1878/79-1934). In this case, she was nine or ten years old when she was painted by Sickert in Little Dot Hetherington at the Old Bedford. She later married William Ritchie. Wendy Baron, wrote that the music hall actress was a modern muse for Sickert, and quoted a contemporary of Sickert's, the painter Frederick Wedmore, who mentioned in a letter that Sickert was inspired to paint Little Dot Hetherington in much the same way as the 18th-century painter George Romney was inspired to paint Lady Hamilton.

Dennis Denisoff, in his monograph on children and 19th-century consumer culture, writes that Dot Hetherington (whose dates of birth and death remain unknown to him), like other performers of her ilk, began performing music hall schlager songs at a very early age, often singing provocative songs designed to appeal to a very adult audience.

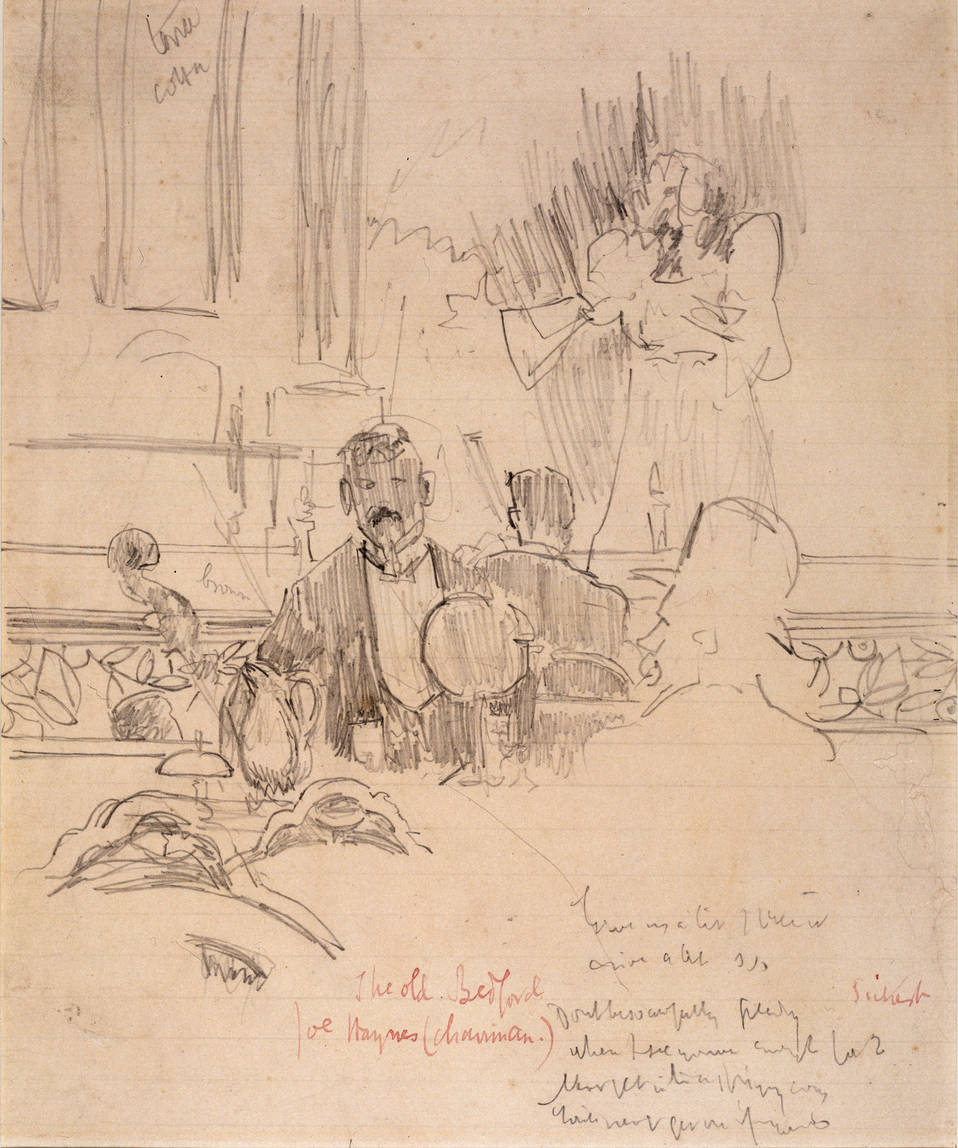
Walter Sickert. Old Bedford (Hines is depicted in the center and signed with his name), ca. 1890

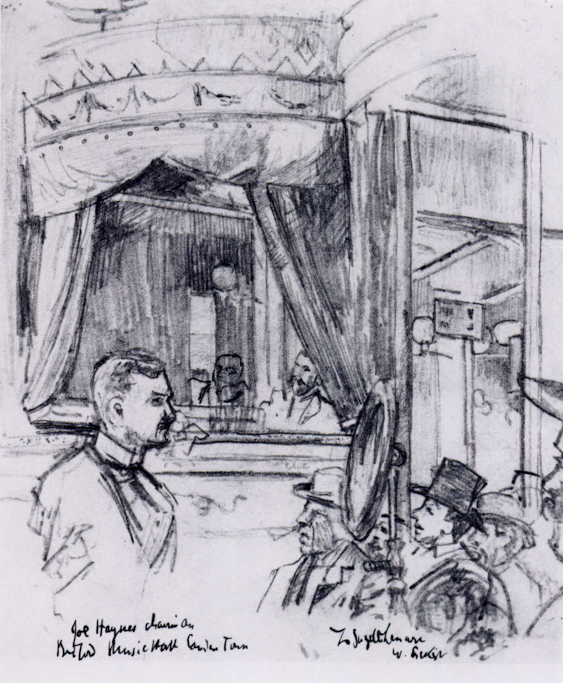
Walter Sickert. Joe Hines in Old Bedford, sketch, ca. 1888

John Roy Major, a British politician and Prime Minister of United Kingdom from 1990 to 1997, wrote in his book on the history of music hall that Little Dot was probably only eight years old and just beginning her career when Sickert sketched her performance. She was talented and had already won accolades from the press. "Very intelligent and graceful, this little girl... a wonderful little versatile artist... a versatile little American with a vivid and distinctive personality. She appeared as a dozen characters and changed costumes so quickly and neatly that she won rapturous applause", he quoted an unnamed source as saying. Major corrected the publication's error, adding that Dot was actually English, not American. He felt that the columnist had been misled by the fact that she had appeared on the Old Bedford stage with the American troupe Moore and Burgess Minstrels. Major pointed out that many future music hall stars began their careers as children, singing songs with adult themes, but he felt that Dot was still too young "to be singing about adult love to a predominantly male audience". He mentioned that Dot went on to tour with Vesta Tilley and in the mid-1890s played the role of Cinderella in the pantomime of the same name.

Art historians have also been able to identify another character in the painting, Joe Hines, who was depicted by Sickert in a drawing of Old Bedford. It is now believed that the surviving portrait of Joe Hines is unrelated to the painting Little Dot Hetherington at the Old Bedford, but was painted around the same time. It is in the collection of the Walker Gallery, Liverpool. It is not the only depiction of the Old Bedford regular by Sickert. The Victoria and Albert Museum owns a drawing, The Old Bedford (pencil, paper, circa 1890, inv. CIRC.87-1958), which depicts Hines, his name signed directly on the front of the drawing.

=== Secondary title ===
The Boy I Love is Up in the Gallery, the song that became the second title of the painting in 1895, was written by George Ware in 1885 and first performed in London by the singer Nellie Power, but the song became famous in the same year, 1885, after Mary Lloyd performed it. It is written in the name of a girl who has recently arrived from the provinces and has a lover. He is currently on the galley, watching the girl sing and waving his handkerchief cheerfully. The girl claims that her lover is called a bootmaker, but he is actually a tradesman and works in Borough Market in Southwark. The girl sings that if she were a duchess and had a lot of money she would give it all to her lover, but she doesn't have a coin, so they will live in love and kisses and be as happy as birds.

William Rough pointed out that the song has strong sexual overtones and is sung in the first person. William Rough also argued that it was about the artist playing with the duality of

External videos
- | The Boy I Love is Up in the Gallery

innocence and experience, which was popular with the public. This theme-play became "a favourite subject of writers and poets, especially those studying at Oxford in the 1880s, where there was a cult of little girls''. He cited as examples the attention and affection paid to the seven-year-old actress Minnie Terry by the poet and decadent writer Ernest Christopher Dawson and the writer, cartoonist and book illustrator Max Beerbohm. Rough, however, felt that the theme of the innocence/experience of the young performer in Sickert's painting was overshadowed by another, more important theme for the author — the submission of the audience to the will of the performer. Max Beerbohm has suggested that Sickert's paintings may have initiated the public's fascination with young actresses, but Wendy Baron has noted that many of Queen Victoria's subjects "discovered the appeal of these performers at the same time as Sickert". In the 2000 edition of Sickert's catalogue of prints, Ruth Bromberg's Little Dot Hetherington at the Old Bedford includes the text of the very song the singer sang in the music hall. According to Rice University professor Marcia Brennan, a reviewer of the publication, the inclusion of such details in the catalogue "greatly contributes to the reader's ability to contextualise the story" by recreating its historical and cultural setting.

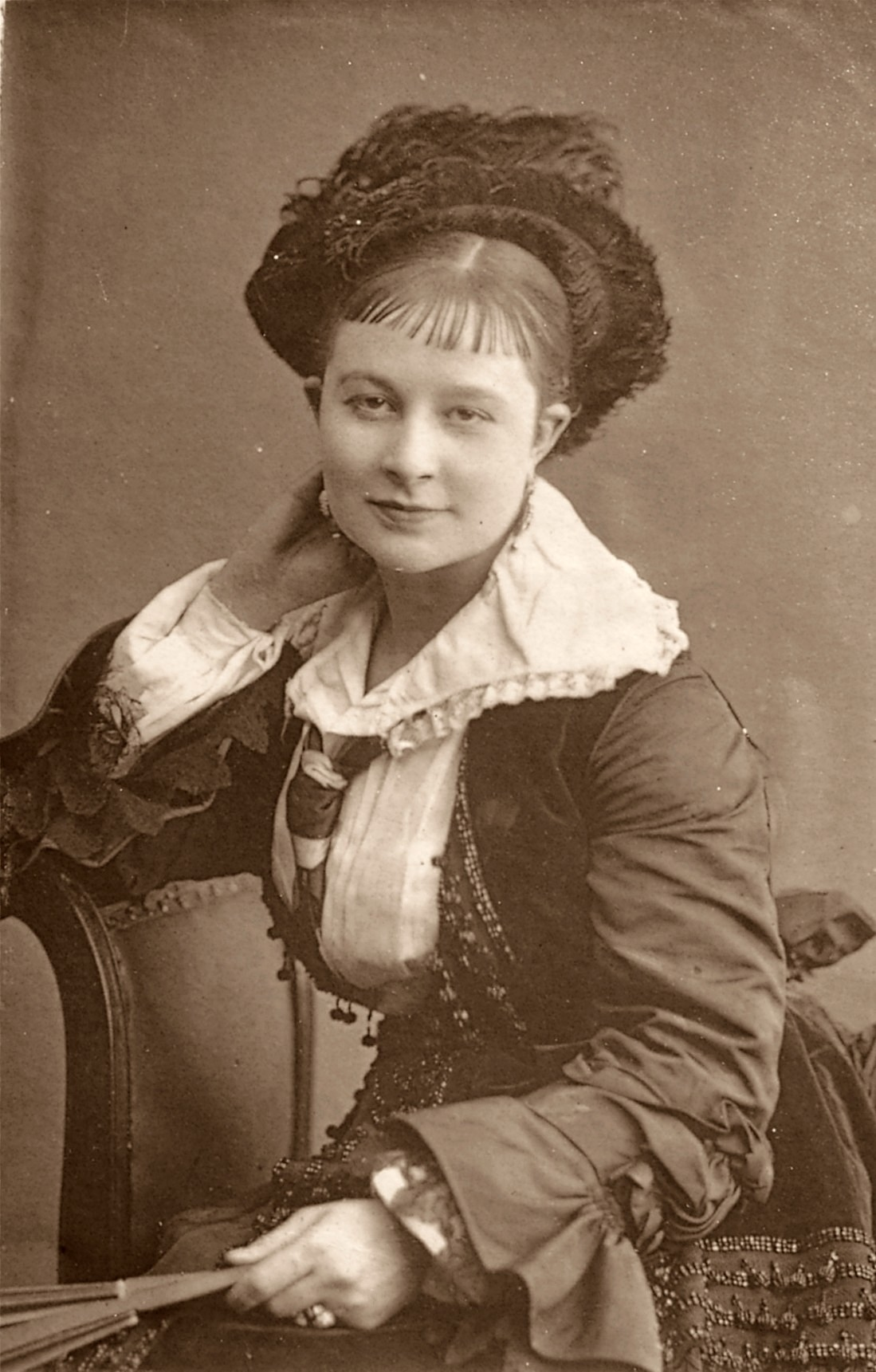
Unknown Photographer. Nellie Power, before 1887

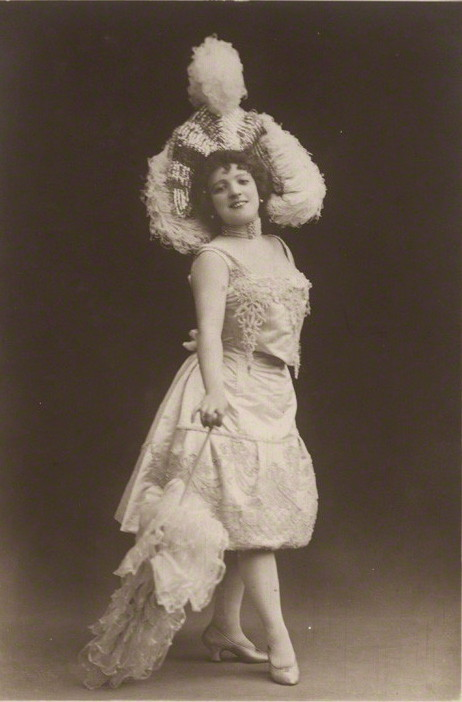
Unknown photographer. Mary Lloyd, 1890s

== Sickert's oeuvre ==
=== Preparatory work ===
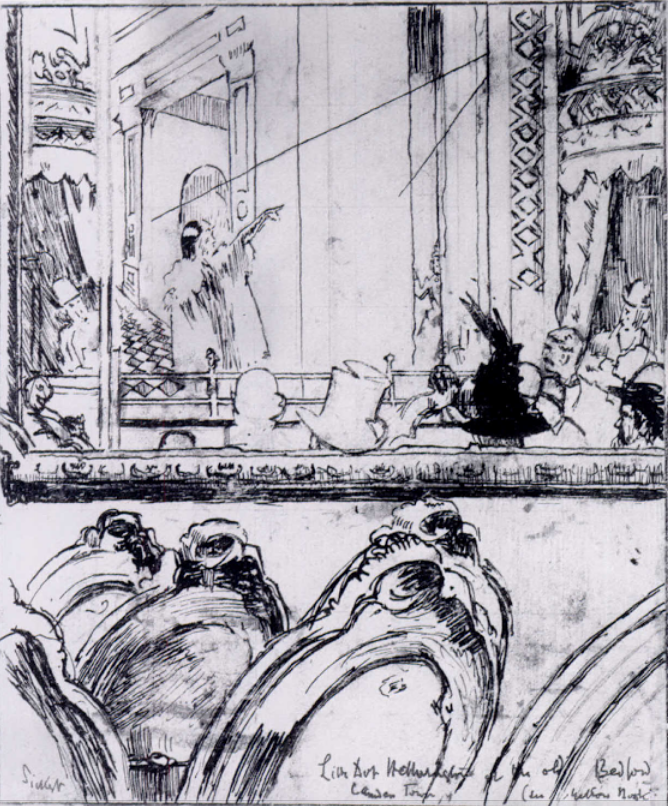
Walter Sickert. Little Dot Hetherington at the Old Bedford, Camden Town, sketch, ca. 1888

In a 1973 monograph on the artist, Wendy Baron identified the following sketches for the painting among Sickert's works:

- Sketch of the composition of the painting, executed in watercolour and black chalk. It measures 31.8 x 26.8 cm. The sketch is in the collection of the National Trust of Great Britain and was exhibited at the Tate Gallery in 1960.
- Around 1888 Sickert sketched Little Dot Hetherington at the Old Bedford, Camden Town, singing The Boy I Love is up in the galley. Its size is 32.4 x 26.7 cm (others say 32.2 x 26.6 cm). The execution technique is fountain pen and black ink, graphite pencil on heavy beige smooth paper. It is inscribed in black ink at lower right: Little Dot Hetherington at the Old Bedford | Camden Town (see Yellow Book)", with the author's signature, also in black ink, at lower left: SICKERT. The sketch is undated. It is in the Yale Centre for British Art at the Yale Art Gallery (Mary Gertrude Abbey Foundation, Prints and Graphics Collection, inventory number — B1979.12.819, according to other sources — 1961.9.37). In this sketch, the image already forms a square, making it easy to transfer to canvas. This sketch was shown in an exhibition in New York in 1967, and in exhibitions in cities in Australia in 1979, and in New York and the Yale Centre for British Art in 2000.
- In her 1973 monograph on Sickert's work, Wendy Baron suggested that a pencil drawing by Joe Hines from the Walker Gallery was also a sketch for the painting. In the 1992 and 2006 monographs, the art historian retracted such a claim.
- Another sketch for the painting was reproduced in The Idler for March 1895, p. 169. The fate and whereabouts of the original are unknown.

Walter Sickert's 1992 exhibition catalogue mentions two of the artist's sketches for the painting. The second sketch (the first from Yale University) is in the collection of the University of Reading Art Gallery. The interior sketches, which scholars of Sickert's work have suggested he made to work out the image of the figures in the mirror, are lost.

=== Comparison to The Old Bedford ===
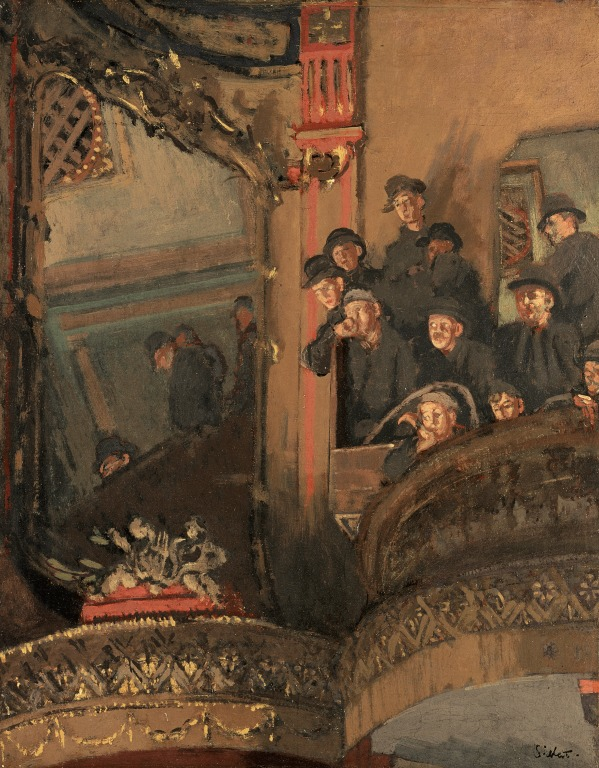
Walter Sickert. Old Bedford, before 1895

The art historians at the Walker Gallery, Liverpool, insist that the 1947 acquisition of the painting The Old Bedford (inventory number WAG 2264, 76.3 x 60.5, oil on canvas, date unknown, probably painted around 1890 and first exhibited in 1895), (Note: William Rough dates The Old Bedford to around 1895 and gives different dimensions: 76.2 x 60.4 cm (the same dimensions are given in the 1992 Sickert exhibition catalogue). In his article, as in the catalogue, the painting appears under the title "The Gallery of the Old Bedford". Rough did not consider this painting to be paired with Little Dot Hetherington. Eric Shanes also dated this painting to 1895. He also saw it as a pairing with Little Dot.) which shows a galley and the audience in it reflected in the wide mirror on the left, can be correlated with Little Dot Hetherington at the Old Bedford as a pairing. It shows the girl perhaps pointing to that particular part of the hall. The Old Bedford also reflects the theatrical atmosphere of the late nineteenth century and is a 'brilliant exercise' in lighting and composition. Sickert exploits the contrast between the semi-darkened gallery and the reflected light of the stage, and creates the illusion of an enlarged space by using a huge mirror.

Wendy Baron mentions the belief among art historians that The Old Bedford is paired with Little Dot Hetherington, and even points out that the title Cupid on the Galley is occasionally used for different versions of The Old Bedford. In her catalogue of Sickert's work, she cites a publication in The Idler for March 1895, where a reproduction of a sketch for The Old Bedford is entitled The Boy I Love Is Up in the Galley. John Major had no doubt about the paired nature of The Old Bedford and Little Dot Hetherington, quoting Speakers Magazine art critic George Moore's characterisation of the painting: "I admire Walter Sickert's painting of the Music Hall Gallery because of the rare beauty of the colouring. I like it for its beauty of tone, colour and composition... A great mirror in which indistinct shadows are reflected, is it not a triumph?"

In her 1973 monograph on Sickert, Baron argued that the original title of The Old Bedford was The Boy I Love is Up in the Galley, so it must clearly have been associated in the author's mind with Little Dot. He wrote that The Old Bedford was Sickert's only major work on the music hall theme of the 1890s, and that he revisited it many times. Some of the artist's works are preparatory sketches, while others are later reworkings of the composition. These works include etchings, sketches of individual episodes and full sketches for the painting. A comparison of the various versions of The Old Bedford, according to Baron, "provides a striking illustration of the variety of Sickert's styles, not only within a single genre in a single decade, but also within a single subject".

=== Little Dot's variations ===
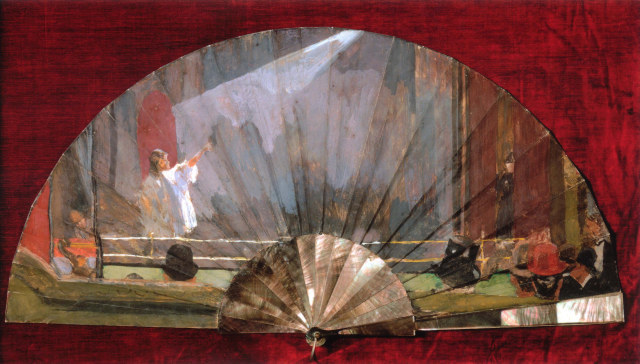
Walter Sickert. Fan Little Dot Hetherington at the Old Bedford, ca. 1890

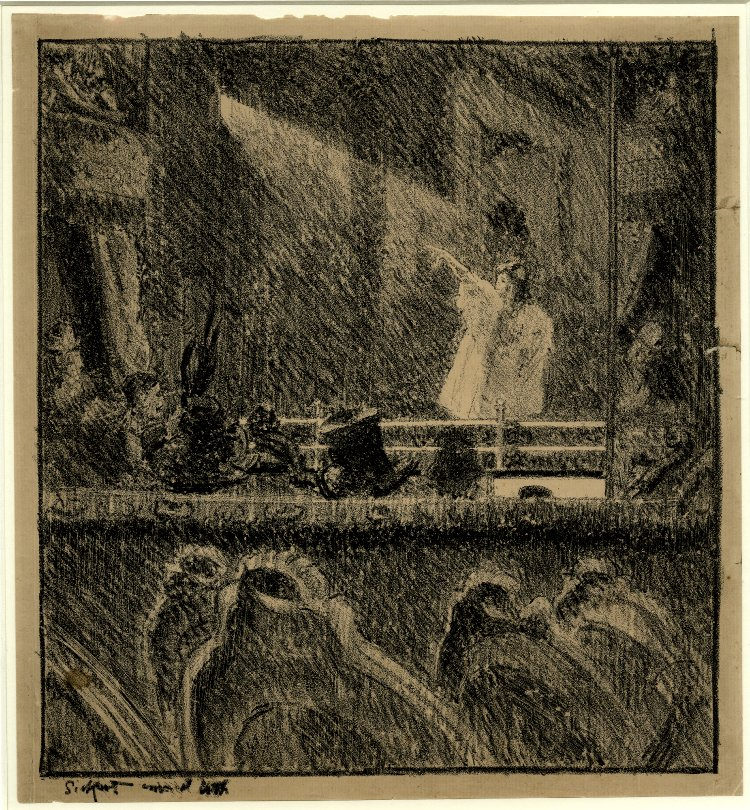
Walter Sickert. Little Dot Hetherington at the Old Bedford (lithograph from the British Museum), circa 1894

The Fan Museum in Greenwich owns a fan hand-painted by Sickert after his painting. The exact date of the fan is unknown. It is tentatively dated to the 1890s. In the museum's exhibition the fan is called Little Dot Hetherington at the Old Bedford. Experts note the influence of Edgar Degas in the painting, which is evident in the rather sombre colour palette and careless brushstrokes. The technique of the fan is gouache on prepared vellum, and mother-of-pearl was used in its manufacture. The image is taken from a painting by Sickert, but adapted to the shape of the fan. Sickert gave the fan to his friend, pupil and sitter Florence Pasch. The fan remained in her family's possession until it was purchased by the Museum of Fans in Greenwich (inventory number in the museum's collection is LDFAN2005.50). The purchase was funded by the National Lottery through the Hermitage Lottery Fund and an anonymous donation. The fan has a radius of 33 centimetres. It was exhibited in Leeds in 1942 and in Brighton in 1962.

It has been suggested that "the print is ideally suited to Sickert's artistic flair". Marshia Brennan, Ph.D., Professor of Art and Architectural History at Rice University, wrote that Sickert's paintings demonstrate a combination of the viewpoint of the flâneur, the detached observer of the public spaces of modern life, and that of the voyeur, who actively seeks opportunities to see the "private and intimate corners" of the individual. She cited the music hall and the prostitute's bedroom as the main themes of Sickert's work. Around 1894 Sickert made a lithograph entitled Little Dot Hetherington at the Old Bedford. It measures 29.4 by 26.4 centimetres. The stone from which the print was made bears the carved inscription Sickert inv. et lith. One of the lithographs is in the collection of the British Museum (acquired in 1917 as a gift from Sylvia Gosse, inventory number — 1917,0419.2). The other print is in the collection of the Victoria and Albert Museum (inventory number CIRC.407-1962).

The print historian and writer Martin Hopkinson described the lithograph Little Dot Hetherington at the Old Bedford as brilliant and noted that Sickert did not use prints in his creative work after its creation until 1907.

== Artistic features ==
=== Origins of Sickert's intention ===
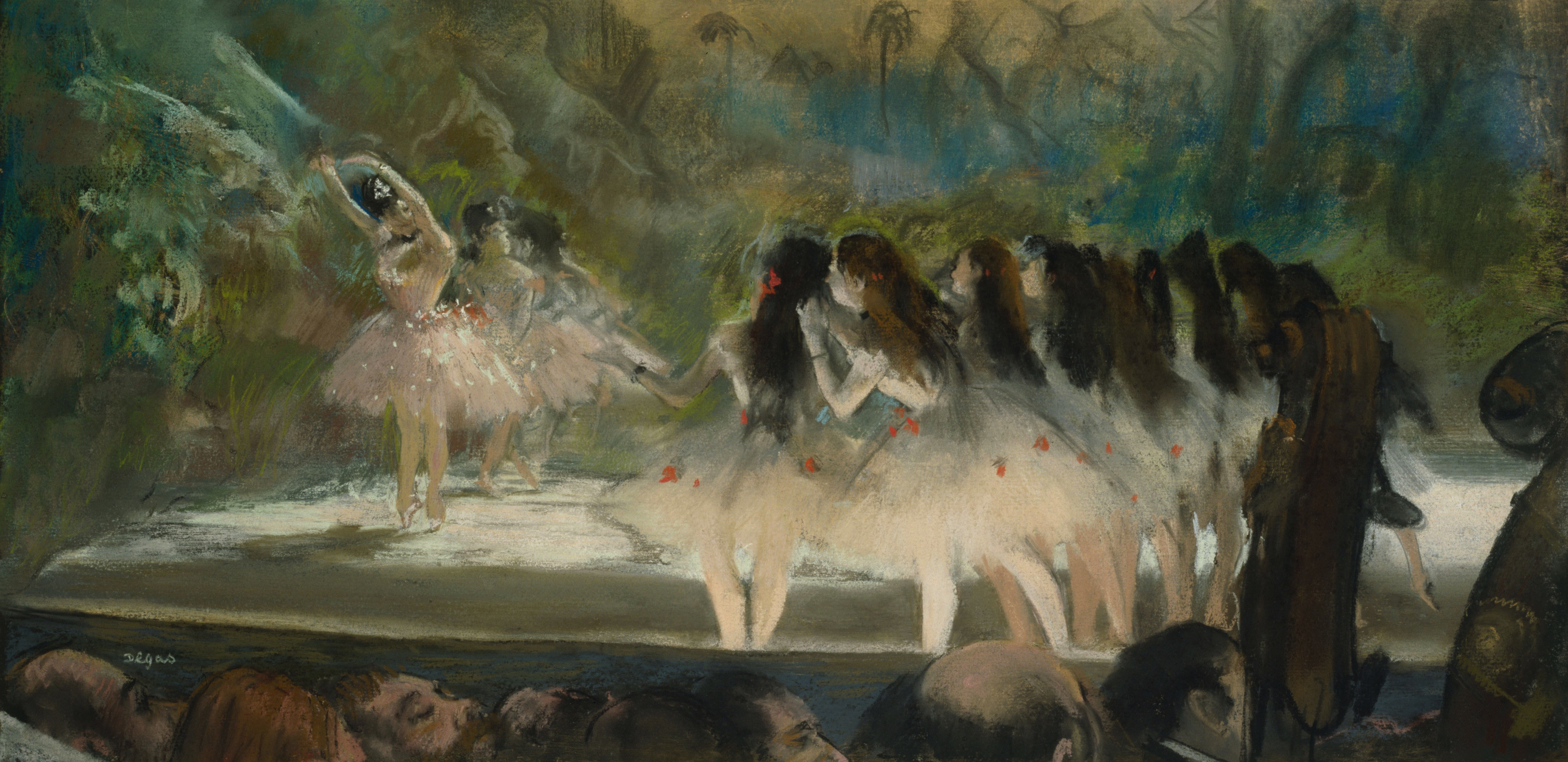
Edgar Degas. Ballet at the Paris Opera, 1877

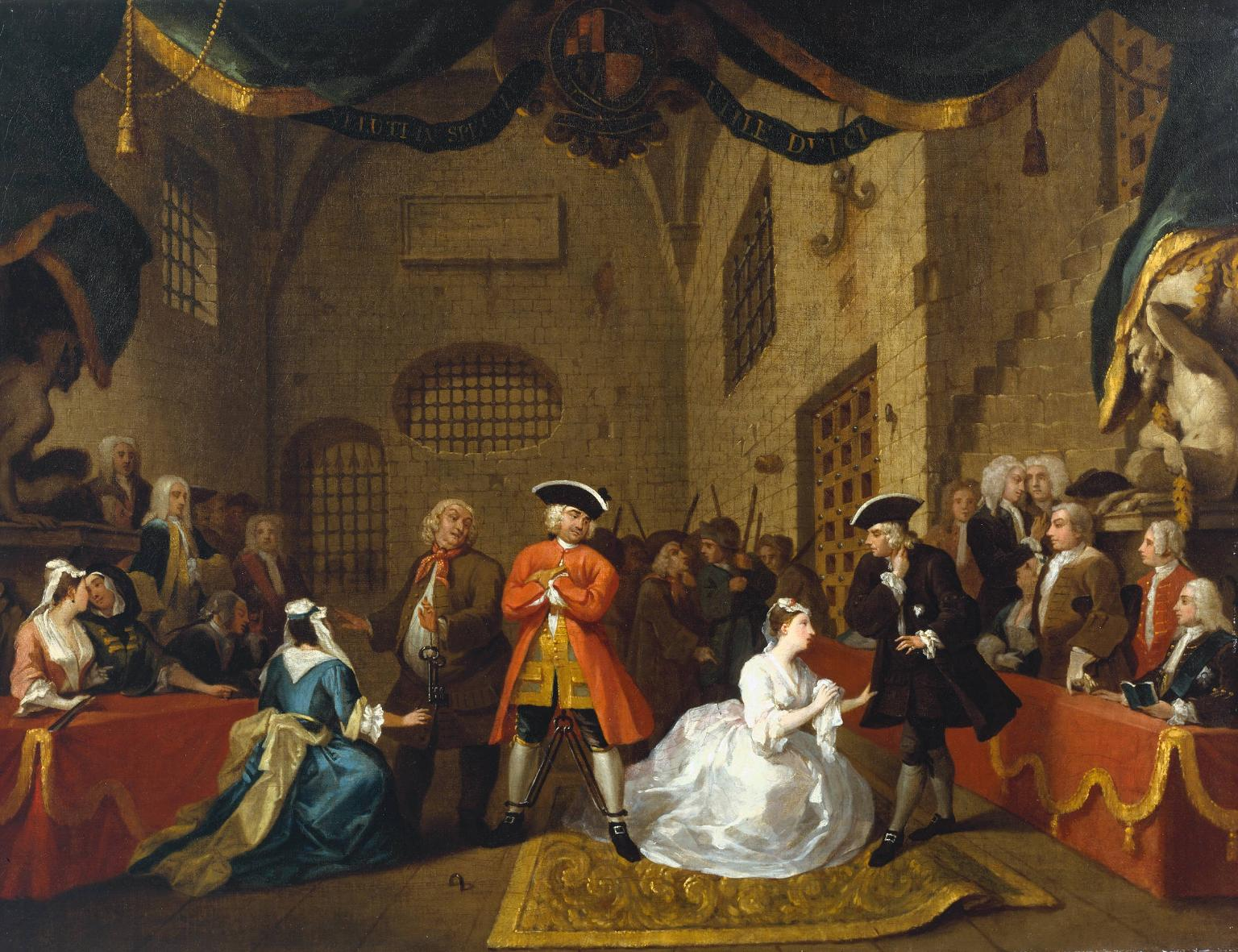
William Hogarth. The Beggar's Opera, scene XI. act III, 1728

The British art historian and director of the Courtauld Institute of Art from 1980 to 1993, Dennis Farr, wrote that Sickert's first paintings of theatre or music hall interiors date from three years before Little Dot Hetherington at the Old Bedford. In these paintings, "he [the artist] shows his devotion to Degas no less by his choice of subject than by the manner in which he depicts it". More often than not, Sickert adopted a low vantage point, corresponding to the view of the scene from the parterre. This position of the observer can be found in many of Degas's paintings and pastels of the 1870s. The performers are depicted above the heads of the spectators. Like Degas, Sickert deliberately leaves objects of secondary importance to him on the periphery of the composition in order to focus the viewer's attention on the protagonist, the singer Dot Hetherington. In the composition of Little Dot Hetherington at the Old Bedford, however, Sickert introduced a new factor that complicated the composition — a mirror. Farr also noted that the greenish-brown colour scheme characteristic of many of Sickert's paintings of the early 1890s already appears in this painting.

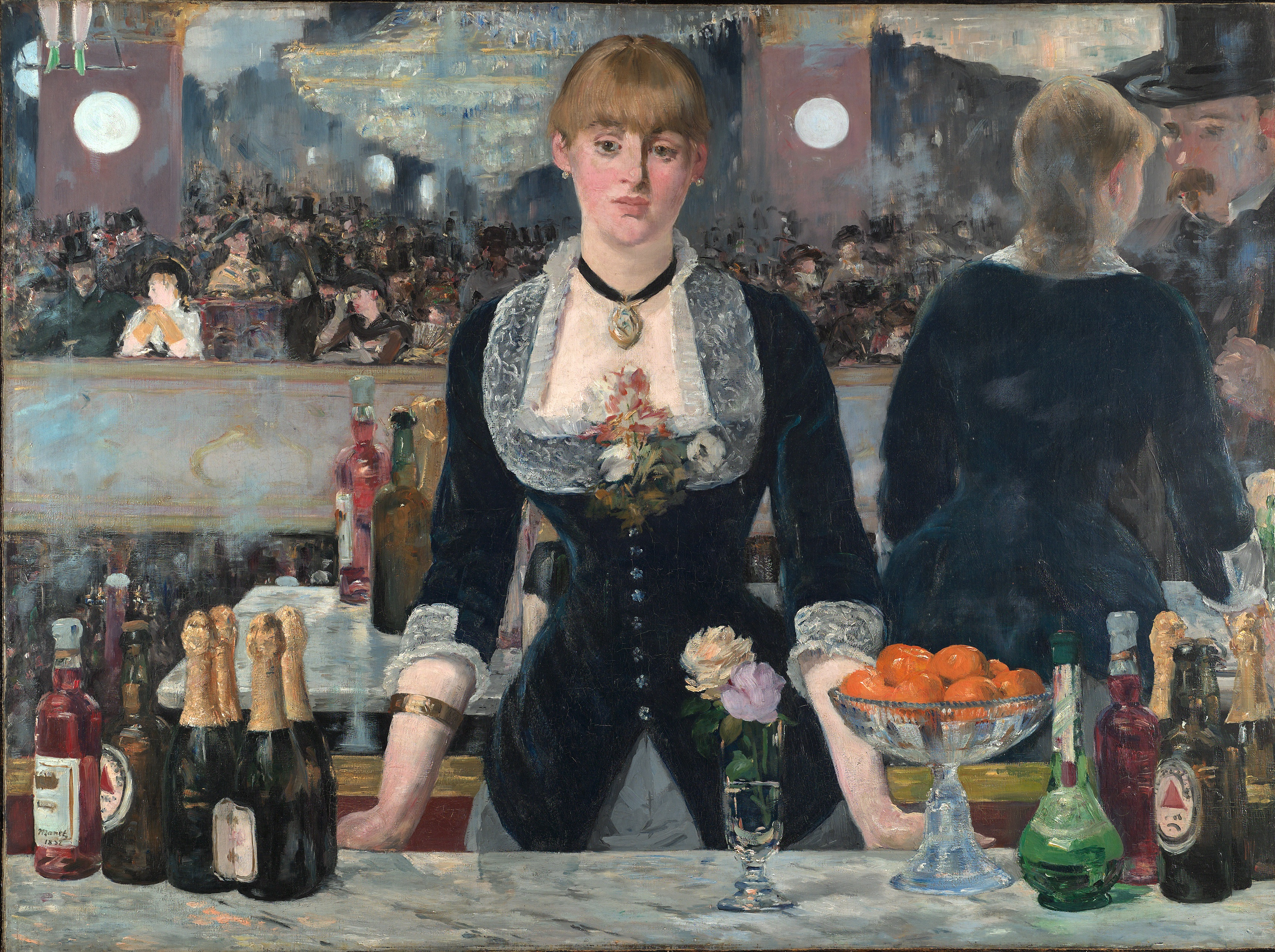
Édouard Manet. Bar at the Folies Bergère, 1882

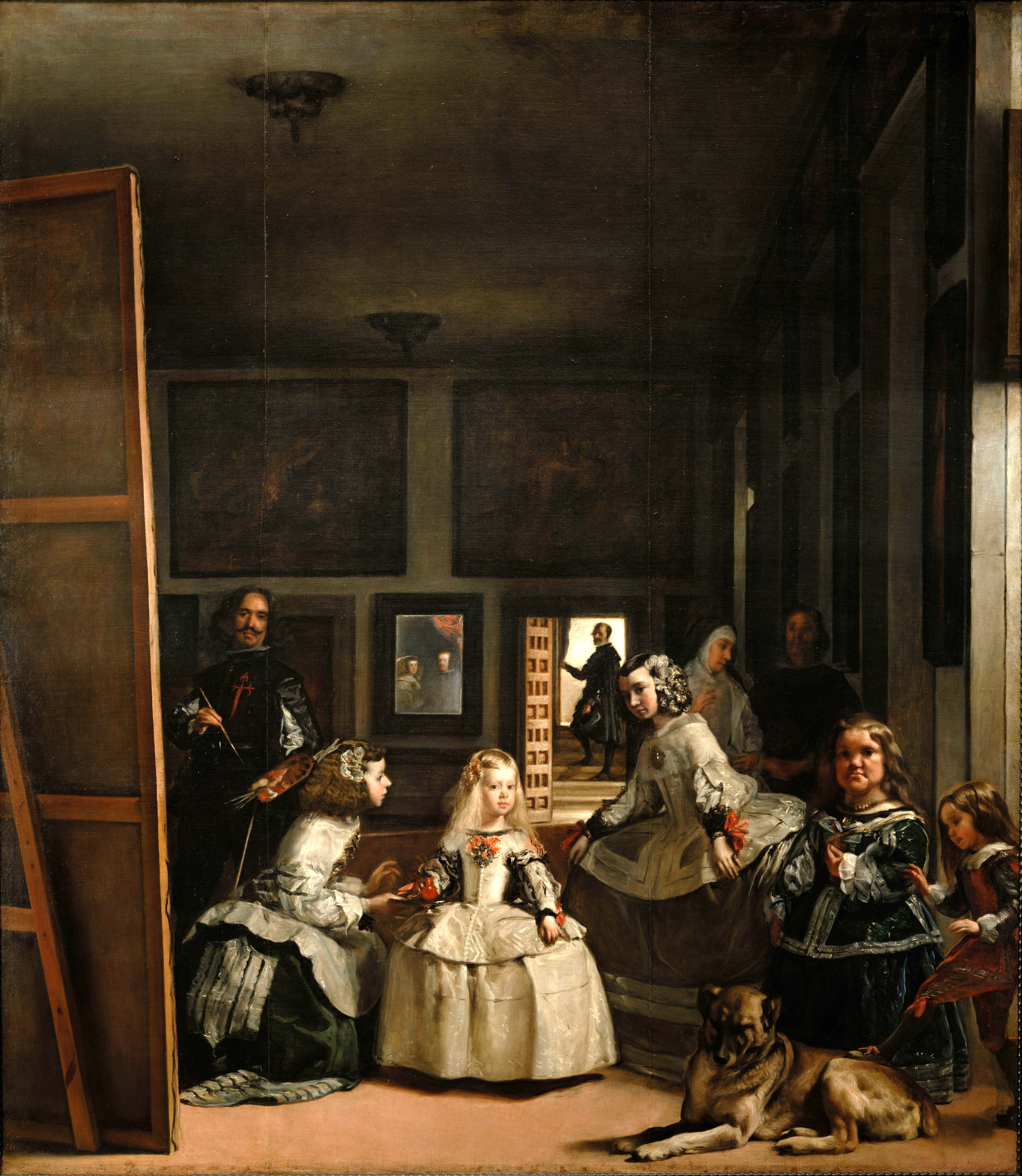
Diego Velázquez. Meninas, 1656

Edward Dudley Johnson noted the love of two British artists for the theatre, Walter Sickert and William Hogarth. The most memorable of Sickert's paintings on the subject, in his opinion, is Little Dot Hetherington. Only on closer inspection does the viewer realise that the scene is depicted as a reflection in a mirror. The artist has depicted the artist waiting to perform, the young singer and the audience, showing "the intimacy between artist and audience that was the main feature of the music hall". The composition of the painting emphasises this connection with Dot Hetherington's outstretched hand pointing to the galley. According to Johnson, Sickert's approach to the play between fantasy and reality may recall Hogarth's depiction of John Gay's The Beggar's Opera, Act III, Scene XI (oil on canvas, 56.0 x 72.5 cm, Tate Gallery, inv. N02437), with the exchange of glances between 'the actress and her noble gentleman in the audience'. Hogarth, in Johnson's view, invites a coherent analysis of the details of his painting, whereas the 'limited focus and compositional density' of Sickert's canvas concentrates "the wealth of meaning in a single momentary impression".

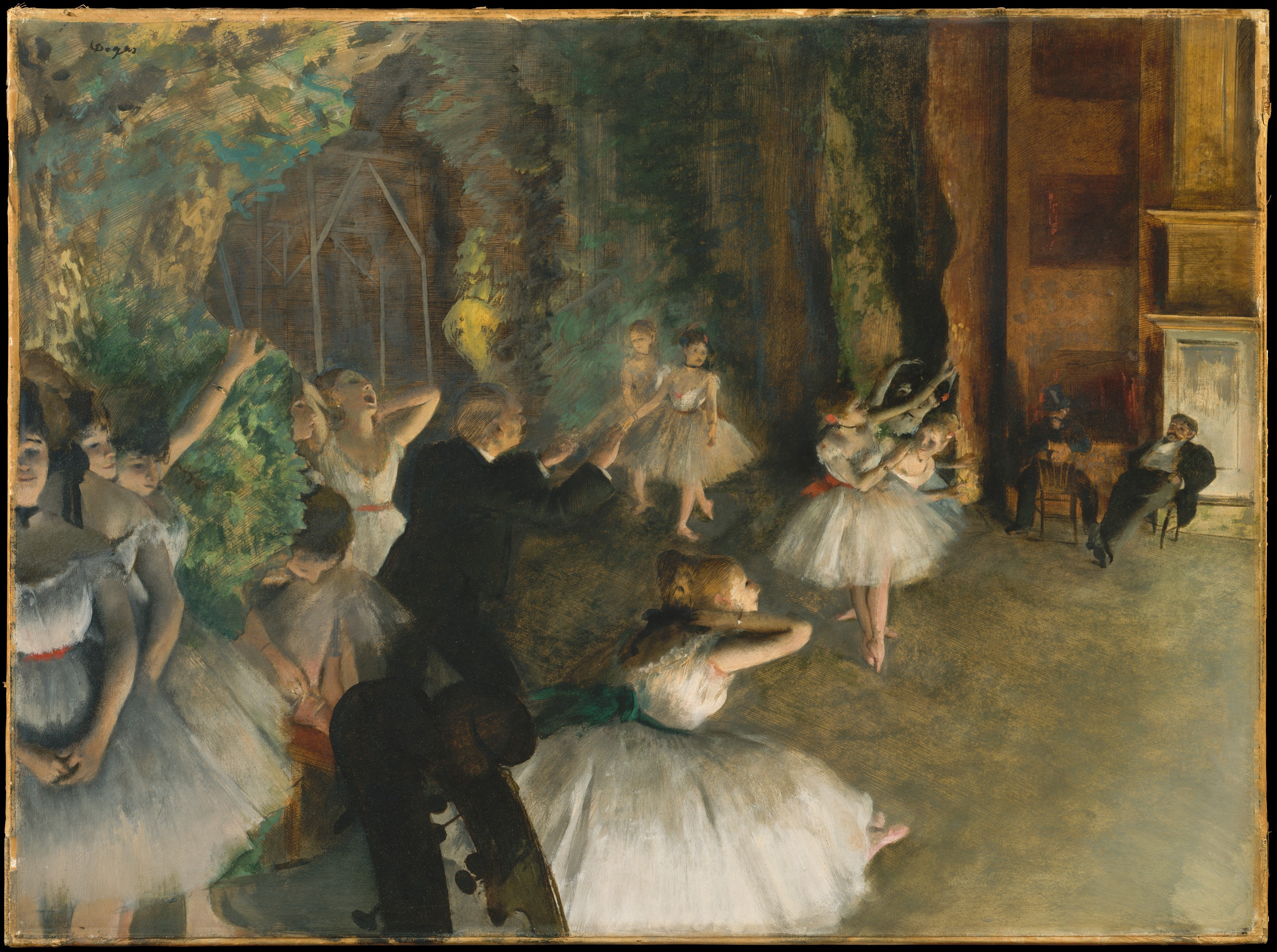
Edgar Degas. Ballet rehearsal on stage, 1874

There was a suggestion that Sickert's idea for the mirrors came after seeing Edouard Manet's painting A Bar at the Folies-Bergère (1882, London, Courtauld Institute of Art, 96 x 130 cm, canvas, oil). It could be seen in Manet's studio in April 1883. Another source of influence for Walter Sickert has been cited by researchers as the painting Meninas by the seventeenth-century Spanish artist Diego Velázquez. Wendy Baron believes that the clearest evidence of Sickert's familiarity with this painting is an article the artist wrote for the newspaper Whirlwind in 1890. In this article, he responded to criticism of a note in The Times against Meninas. According to Baron, it was Velázquez's painting that probably prompted Sickert to include a second mirror reflection in the picture, contained within the first — in Little Dot, part of the mirror on the opposite side, which also reflects the scene, is visible in the large mirror on the right.

Robins wrote that "the eroticism underlying the social intermingling in the hall of men in cylinders and bowler hats gazing at Little Dot is mediated by the mirroring, which reinforces the element of fantasy". According to the researcher, Little Dot in Sickert's painting is in a sense "a younger English version of the young dancers" in Degas's Rehearsal, but the enthusiastic Tiny pointing upwards on the galley is not like the French artist's "sophisticatedly dexterous" girls.

In terms of subject matter and technique, William Rough saw The Little Dot Hetherington as Walter Sickert's response to similar works by James Whistler and Edgar Degas. However, Rough pointed out that neither Degas nor Whistler treated their subject (the cabaret or music hall actress) with such reverence. Degas, for example, tends to focus on the sexual nature of the performance. In Sickert's painting, on the other hand, the "silent, admiring attention" of the usually demanding and rapt audience shows the artist's respect "for the performer's ability to enchant the audience".

=== Colour palette and composition ===
Wendy Baron noted that the girl's charm distracted the viewer from the skilfully constructed composition of the painting. She saw the key to interpreting the complex composition of the canvas in the artist's unambiguous depiction of the mirror frame. According to Baron, the relationship between the individual elements of the scene as a whole becomes immediately clear "when we consider that Sickert not only painted the reflection, but also included a secondary and thus recurring reflection". The sophistication of Sickert's compositional approach is complemented by freedom of interpretation (Baron notes, for example, the highlights that accentuate the drawing) and a vital colour palette.

According to Wendy Baron, Sickert's later paintings echoed the successful ambiguity of Little Dot's composition. In each, a disorderly group of spectators is juxtaposed with an ornate galley and a carved golden mirror. The dark, sombre palette appropriate to the audience and the bright pinks, blues and gilded colours of the interior reinforce the contrast between the setting and its inhabitants. Baron noted the apparent irony of the artist's depiction of the sloppily dressed working class crowded into the opulent splendour of the gallery. Yet she saw it as no coincidence that there was no rigid social hierarchy here, and that the upper echelons had a 'spirit of camaraderie' that epitomised the music-hall atmosphere. In an earlier monograph on Sickert's work, Baron noted that the colour in Little Dot had become "more varied and vivid" than in the artist's earlier works: strokes of vermilion, white and emerald green contrast with the more muted greys, yellows, burgundies and blues of this painting.

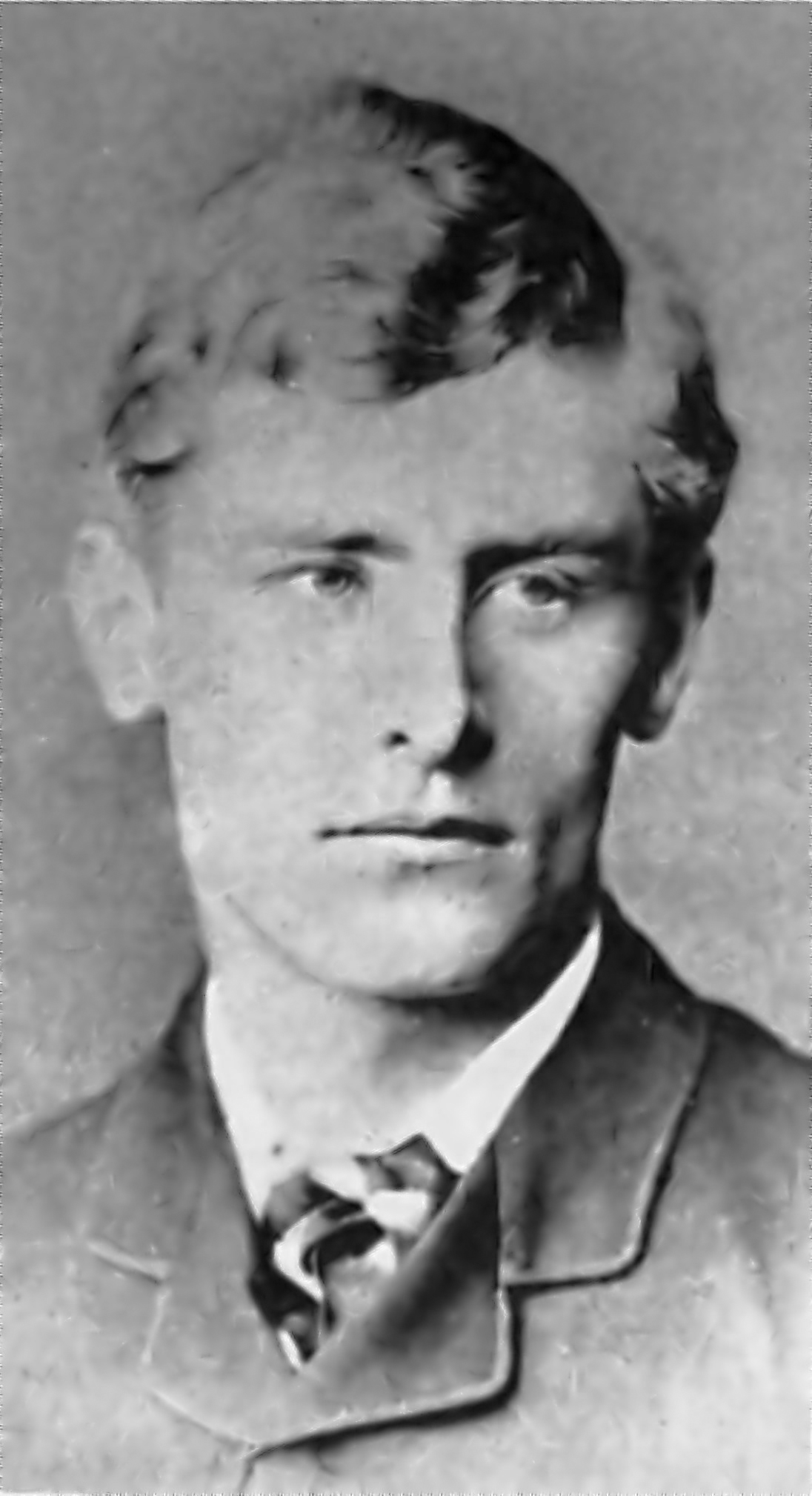
Unknown photographer. Walter Sickert, 1884

In her monograph, Caroline Steedman uses Walter Sickert's painting to analyse the position of the actress in the Victorian era. The painting shows a small white figure reflected in a large mirror, under the intense and awe-inspiring gaze of men (Stidman points out that Sickert showed only one woman among the spectators). The figure of the girl, according to the author, is intended to evoke sympathy in the viewer, who sees on the canvas a fragile child threatened by a world of faceless, probably drunken spectators.

Ann Varty, Professor of Victorian Literature at Royal Holloway, University of London, wrote that the painting shows a small, dark-haired singer, her face looking like a yellow mask because of the make-up covering it, and she is dressed in a translucent white gown that shows off the shape of her body. Her left arm is outstretched, pointing towards the galley. The girl is illuminated by a beam of light that pierces the darkness of the theatre. She is physically separated from the audience by a brass railing at the front of the stage, but the barrier seems unusually high, emphasising her small stature and the tantalising inaccessibility of her body. Varty noted that the most striking feature of the composition is that little Dot is reflected in a huge gilded mirror, the top edge of which matches the frame of the painting. In her view, Sickert has deliberately removed the distinction in the painting between the child as a social being and the child as an obsessive figment of an adult's imagination. Varty notes that the title of the painting, given in 1895, was inspired by Mary Lloyd's famous song The Boy I Love is Up in the Gallery, but the person to whom the girl in the painting is reaching out is not the favourite boy, but the adult people in the audience who are "flattered" by the child singer's expression of sympathy.

David Peters Corbett notes the combination of realism and symbolism in the painting, which allows the depth of the inner meaning of the scene to be reflected. In his opinion, there is a tension between the visual series and the inner essence of what is happening. The space is deliberately misleading: what we initially accept as reality is revealed to the viewer as a reflection in a mirror, so that the direction of the little singer's gestures must be reconstructed in a mirror image. Sickert's painting becomes a puzzle. According to Corbett: "The painting reminds us that we cannot trust appearances because of the theatrical and therefore illusory nature of the representation depicted". Sickert uses mirrors and theatrical devices to draw the viewer's attention to "the instability of representation and appearance".

David Wilse has described this painting as one of the most complex in the artist's oeuvre, arguing that much of the painting, apart from the empty audience seats below the girl's image, is a reflection in a mirror, so that the audience depicted in the painting is no more material than the girl performer (Donohue and Robinson agree). Sickert himself once recalled an episode that took place in a small hall in Islington, and associated it with the painting: a graceful girl leaning from the stage to the audience to emphasise the content of one of the sentimental ballads so popular with the hall's regulars aroused spontaneous sympathy and attention from an audience whose mood had previously been sombre.

Sickert's contemporary, the Irish poet and novelist George Augustus Moore, admired the way the painting conveyed light, a sense of space and the limits of that space. The painter Dugald Sutherland McColl also admired the stage lighting but admitted to being disappointed by Sickert's lack of detail, even allowing himself a disparaging comparison between Sickert and Edgar Degas. McColl felt that the figure of the girl on the stage had been reduced to a blob of reflected light and was disturbed by Sickert's lack of attention to the interior. Sickert himself replied that he painted music-hall interiors for their beauty, created by the coincidence of a series of accidental elements of form and colour.

John Stokes, a lecturer at Warwick University and later Professor of English Literature at King's College London, notes that Sickert was attracted not by the "fabulous" atmosphere of the music hall, but by its "restless mysteries", which is why, unlike other "'admirers" of the genre, he preferred this particular hall on the outskirts of London to the more prestigious ones in the centre of the capital. In Little Dot Hetherington at the Old Bedford, Stokes says, a girl teases the gallery, claiming that she can see them as they can see her. The artist is aware of the illusory nature of this claim and hints at it by showing only the girl's reflection in the mirror. The artist himself, according to Stokes, concentrates on depicting the audience, who sit facing the stage, oblivious to the artist's interest in them. The blurred drawing of the audience's faces suggests a kind of collective identity, but like "birds on a wire, they never coalesce into a group".

Stokes notes that Sickert fundamentally rejected sentimental interpretations of his subjects and the final judgement of his characters. He argues that the artist's early works capture the everyday life of the music hall, uniting the audience with the performers, while those made after his return from France in 1905 depict either the audience, the performers or the interior architecture.

Alan Robinson notes that the artist contrasts the singing girl in the almost aether white light (conjuring up images of a serene, happy Arcadia) with the ominous figure in black from the auditorium. He juxtaposes this painting with Sickert's Self-Portrait (c. 1896), showing the artist's dark desolation, which he projected in his paintings of urban leisure. Noting that not only the girl but also the audience are depicted by Sickert in the hall's side mirrors, Alan Robinson attributes this decision by the artist to Sickert's desire to depict his music hall subjects in two-dimensional rather than three-dimensional space. This was developed in his other paintings of similar subject matter. Robinson also notes that the artist's intention was to make the music hall audience itself a spectacle.

Ming-Tsuei Ni, Ph.D., a lecturer at the National Taipei University of Education Ming-Tsuei Ni has written with regret that many contemporary art historians have tended to avoid the question of the influence of theatre on Sickert's paintings, seeing the artist as a man primarily interested in composition and colour, who paid little attention to narrative. Min-tsuei Ni himself has attempted to examine the music hall imagery in Sickert's paintings as arising from the intersection of everyday life and theatrical performance. According to the scholar, Sickert, like his French contemporaries, sought to refine the language of artistic imagery in order to depict everyday life in contemporary England. In his representations of Bedford, he "for the first time abandoned Degas's simple formula" and presented the audience with a series of visual techniques to create "a comprehensive view of performers and audience, stage and audience".

Min-Tsuei Ni described Little Dot Hetherington at the Old Bedford as one of Sickert's first two paintings (along with The Music Hall, or The Right Part of the Backstage in the Mirror on the Left, Eng. S. Wings in the O. P. P. Mirror, c.1889, canvas, oil, 76.2 x 63.5 cm, and framed 90.5 x 77.5 x 7.3 cm, the work is unsigned and undated by the artist, the canvas is in the collection of the Musée des Beaux-Arts in Rouen, inv. 8179, acquired in 1944) in which the artist "used mirrors as an integral part of his compositions". (Note: The same point was expressed by Wendy Baron in her 1973 essay on Sickert's work. She also pointed out that in his first paintings with mirrors, Sickert obscured their presence. The frame of the mirror in the painting Little Dot is the only clue to identifying the depicted scene as a reflection. According to her, such a motif is completely absent from the artist's later works.) In both paintings, Sickert was experimenting with representation. The actual space in them is unclear and ambiguous. Almost every object the artist depicts is represented as its reflection in a mirror. This mirror creates an illusory space that includes, for example, the audience in a music hall. Min-tsuei Ni wrote that in the painting Little Dot Hetherington at the Old Bedford, the little performer is reflected twice in double mirrors. As the specialist on Sickert's work, Robins, has pointed out, this image is linked not only to the artist's interest in role-playing, but also to the duality of the artist's personality, which manifests itself in the course of the performance. The disorientating space of the painting and the peculiarities of the arrangement of the minor characters in relation to the protagonist probably create, according to the author's intention, "disorder and a multiplicity of simultaneous perceptions in a crowded space". Ni concluded: "Sickert's painting reflects our phenomenological, sensual and visual experience in unusual formal structures".

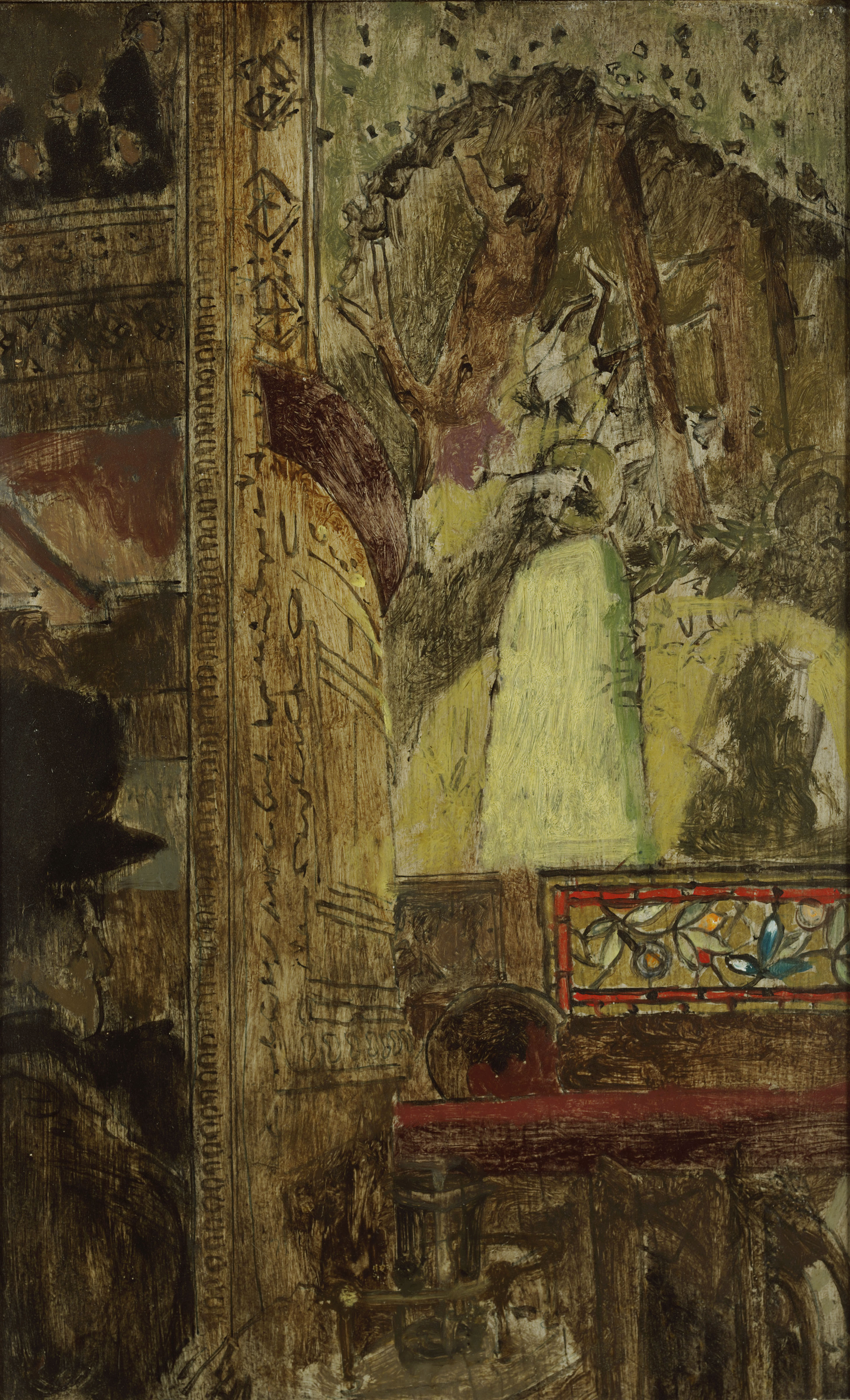
Walter Sickert. Vesta Victoria at the Old Bedford, circa 1890.

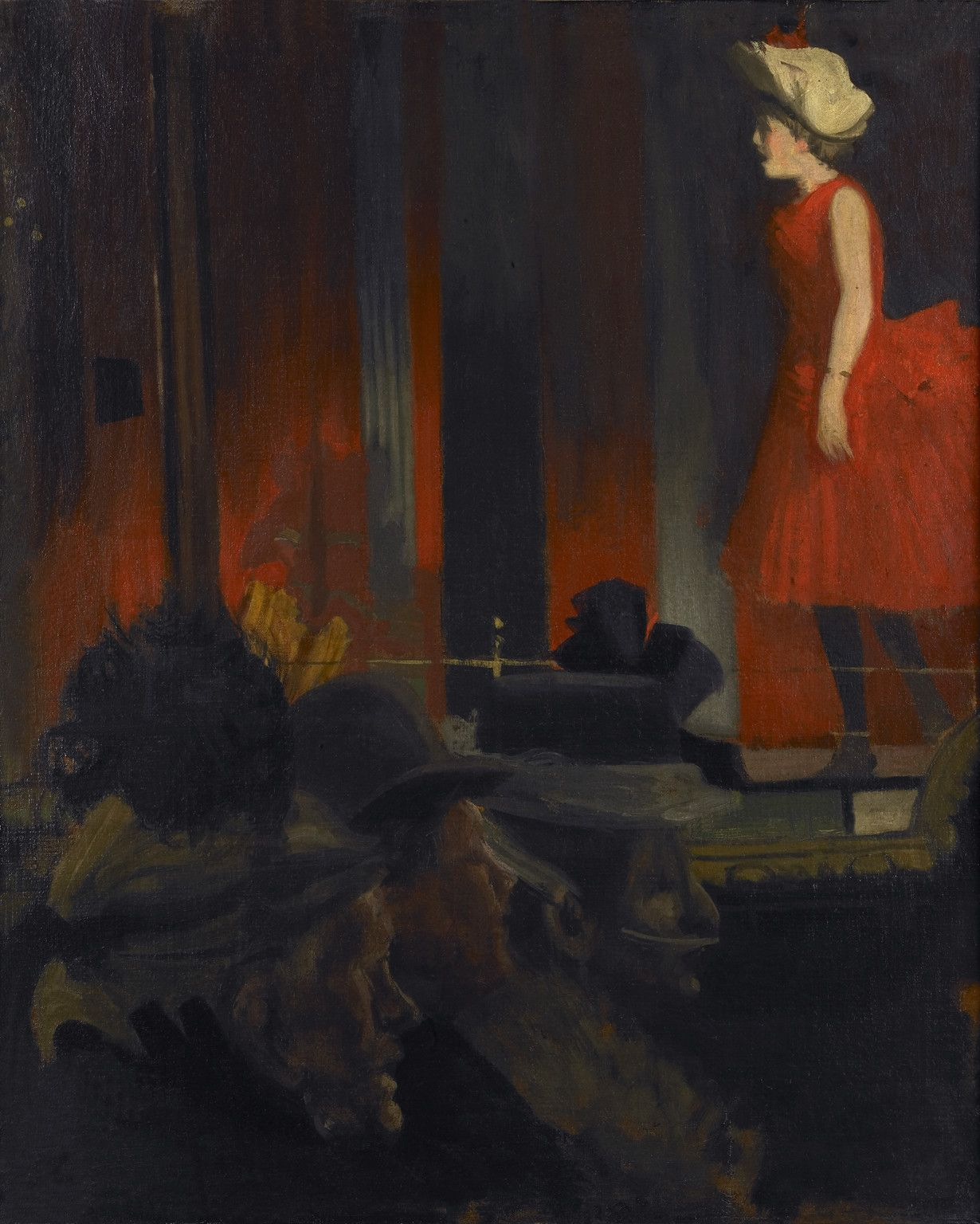
Walter Sickert. Music Hall, or The right side of the backstage mirror on the left, 1888-1889

William Rough noted that mirrors allow the audience to see themselves on the same spatial planes as the performers, and to secretly observe those seated nearby without drawing attention to themselves. The mirror reinforces the sense of the artificiality of what is happening on stage. Its presence breaks the "fourth wall" between the audience and the performer, as well as between the viewer and the image. The mirror also questions the veracity of the image itself. In general, the mirror emphasised duality: the contrast between the outer and the inner self, the physical and the spiritual.

The choice of the moment of performance illustrates the dynamics of the relationship between performer and audience. The singer on stage draws the audience into the world of the performance. Little Dot sings to her bootmaker lover, who introduces himself as a merchant when she meets him. He, in turn, responds to her by waving a handkerchief. The world of illusion and reality are mixed as the singer begins a dialogue with the audience and her lover. William Rough noted the similarity of the painting Little Dot Hetherington at the Old Bedford to Sickert's painting Vesta Victoria at the Old Bradford. In this painting the artist also used a complex perspective, with a large gilded mirror to the left of the picture. The upper part of the mirror reflects the audience with their eyes fixed on the stage. The ghostly figures of the audience on the galley are contrasted by the artist with the refinement and exoticism of Vesta. The audience is fascinated and mesmerised by her performance.

Barry J. Falk, Ph.D., Professor of English Literature at Florida State University, has argued that the images of music hall actresses remain the best known and most discussed in Sickert's work. In his view, the artist's painting Little Dot Hetherington at the Old Bedford (dated 1888–1889) depicts a young singer pointing to the object of her affection, seated on the galley, as she sings the appropriate words of the song's refrain. He believed that Sickert had depicted a similar scene of interaction between the artist and the galley in his painting Vesta Victoria at Old Bedford (c.1890). Falk noted that both paintings exploited a characteristic feature of the interior of Old Bedford — the huge mirrors that reflected both the artist and his audience.

Summarising the analysis of these two paintings in the work of scholars such as David Peters Corbett, John Stokes and William Rough, Falk concluded that for them the presence of mirrors in Sickert's paintings was full of "philosophical significance". At a basic level, the mirror represents an obstacle to the viewer's attempt to understand what is being depicted in the painting. In Vesta Victoria, according to Falk, it is extremely difficult to distinguish between reality and the reflection in the mirror. In Lillte Dot, "the patient viewer eventually realises that the singer's dramatic interaction with the men on the galley is a reflection in the mirror at the back of the theatre". However, a deeper study of Sickert's paintings, in Falk's view, inevitably raises larger questions about "the truthfulness of painting in general".

== Bibliography ==
=== Sources ===
- Carroll, L. (2004). Lewis Carroll's diaries: the private journals of Charles Lutwidge Dodgson (Lewis Carroll): the first complete version of the nine surviving volumes with notes and annotations. Containing journal 12, July 1883 to 30 June 1892. ISBN 9-780-9041-1728-8.
- Lhermitte Canvas Brings 900 Gns. The Art News. 1930. p. 18.
- Our Omnibus=Bor. Vol. January — June (vol. 13). The Theater. A Monthly Review and Magazine of the drama, music and the fine arts. 1889. pp. 114–128.
- Parkes, K. (1890). The Bond Street Galleries. Vol. January — September (vol. 1). Igdrasil. pp. 29–30.
- Ritchie, A. C. (1962). "Recent Gifts and Purchases". Yale Art Gallery Bulletin. December (vol. 28, no. 2 / 3). (2/3): 5–54. JSTOR 40514088.
- Two Little (Mrs. John) Wooden Shoes. Punch. 1889. p. 10.
- Walter Richard Sickert // European drawings and watercolors in the Yale University Art Gallery, 1500—1900. New Haven and London: Yale University Art Gallery by Yale University Press. 1970. pp. 144–145. ISBN 978-0-3000-1291-0.
- Walter Sickert (PDF). Vol. July (vol. 2). The Yellow Book. 1894. pp. 220–226. Archived from the original (PDF) on 2016-03-25.

=== Researches and non-fiction ===
- Brouard, K. (2016). В Кэмден-тауне // Модный Лондон. Одежда и современный мегаполис [In Camden Town // Fashion London. Clothes and the modern metropolis]. Библиотека журнала «Теория моды» (in Russian). М.: Новое литературное обозрение. pp. 218–223. ISBN 978-5-4448-0450-6.
- Cornwell, P. (2004). Джек Потрошитель. Кто он? Портрет убийцы [Jack the Ripper. Who is he? A portrait of the killer] (in Russian). М.: Эксмо. p. 170. ISBN 5-699-07828-2.
- Baron, W. (2006). Sickert: Paintings and Drawings. Paul Mellon Centre for Studies in British Art. New Heaven: Yale University Press. p. 586. ISBN 978-0-3001-1129-3.
- Baron, W. (1992). II. 1890 — Autumn 1898. Sickert on Millet and Bastien-Lepage. Catalogue Numbers 14—24 / Little Dot Hetherington at the Old Bedford // [Baron W.; Shone R.]. Sickert: Paintings and Drawings. London, Amsterdam: Van Gogh Museum, Royal Academy of Arts. pp. 13–24, 74–75. ISBN 978-0-3000-5395-1.
- Baron, W. (1973). Sickert. Paul Mellon Centre for Studies in British Art. L.: Phaidon. p. 398. ISBN 0-7148-1543-8.
- Brennan, M. (2001). Reviewed Work: Walter Sickert: Prints: A Catalogue Raisonné by Ruth Bromberg. Vol. Autumn (vol. 33, no. 3). Albion: A Quarterly Journal Concerned with British Studies. pp. 511–513. JSTOR 4053255.
- Corbett, D. P. (2000). Seeing into Modernity: Walter Sickert's Music Hall Scenes, c. 1887 — 1907, and English Modernism. Vol. April (vol. 7, no. 2). Modernism. pp. 285–306.
- Corbett, D. P. (2004). The World in Paint: Modern Art and Visuality in England, 1848—1914. Refiguring modernism. Manchester: Manchester University Press. p. 318. ISBN 978-0-7190-6965-9.
- Cornwell, P. (2017). Ripper: The Secret Life of Walter Sickert. Seattle: Thomas & Mercer. p. 464. ISBN 978-1-5039-3687-4.
- Denisoff, D. (2016). The Nineteenth-Century Child and Consumer Culture. Studies in Childhood, 1700 to the Present. Milton Park: Routledge. p. 256. ISBN 978-1-3518-8495-2.
- Donohue, J. W. (2005). Fantasies of Empire: The Empire Theatre of Varieties and the Licensing Controversy of 1894. Studies Theatre Hist & Culture. Iowa City: University of Iowa Press. p. 304. ISBN 978-1-5872-9643-7.
- Farr, Dennis (1984). Impressionism, the New English Art Club, Sickert and Steer. English art, 1870—1940. Oxford, New York: Oxford University Press. pp. 21–47. ISBN 978-0-1928-1855-3.
- Faulk, B. J. (2013). "The Bedford Music Hall". Victorian Review. Spring (vol. 39, no. 1) (1). Johns Hopkins University Press: 44–50. doi:10.1353/vcr.2013.0033. JSTOR 24496997.
- Hopkinson, M. (2003). Reviewed Work: Walter Sickert: Prints, A Catalogue Raisonné by Ruth Bromberg. Vol. 4. The British Art Journal. pp. 114–115. JSTOR 41614448.
- Johnson, E. D. H. (1986). "6. Victorian Perspectives (II)". Paintings of the British social scene: from Hogarth to Sickert. N. Y.: Rizzoli. p. 287. ISBN 0-8478-0712-6.
- Lovett, C. C. (1990). Alice on Stage: A History of the Early Theatrical Productions of Alice in Wonderland, Together with a Checklist of Dramatic. Adaptations of Charles Dodgson's Works. Paul Mellon Centre for Studies in British Art. N. Y.: Meckler. p. 239. ISBN 978-0-8873-6390-0.
- Major, J. R. (2012). My old man: a personal history of music hall. L.: HarperPress. p. 363. ISBN 978-0-0074-5013-8.
- Ni, M.-T. (2020). Walter Sickert's Music-Hall Scenes and Theatricality of Modern Experience. Vol. December (vol. 8, no. 2). International Journal of Art and Art History. pp. 17–23. ISSN 2374-2321.
- Robins, A. G. (2008). A Fragile Modernism: Whistler and his Impressionist Followers. New Haven & London: Yale University Press. p. 256. ISBN 978-0-3001-3545-9.
- Robins, A. G. (2005). Edgar Degas: Six Friends At Dieppe. Providence: Museum of Art, Rhode Island School of Design. pp. 49–64. ISBN 978-0-9115-1780-4.
- Robinson, А. (2004). Imagining London, 1770—1900. N. Y.: Springer. p. 291. ISBN 9-780-2305-9692-4.
- Rough, W. W. (2010). The Actor, the Butterfly and the Ox // Walter Richard Sickert and the Theatre c. 1880 — c. 1940. A Thesis Submitted for the Degree of PhD at the University of St Andrews. St Andrews: University of St Andrews. pp. 29–46. JSTOR 41615118.
- Rough, W. W. (2009). "Sickert's Mirror: Reflecting duality, identity and performance C. 1890)". The British Art Journal. Spring (vol. 10, no. 3) (3): 138–144. JSTOR 41615118.
- Shanes, Е. V. (1994). The Local Talent // Impressionist London. London, New York, Paris: Abbeville Press. pp. 139–162. ISBN 978-1-5585-9567-5.
- Steedman, C. (1995). Strange Dislocations: Childhood and the Idea of Human Interiority, 1780—1930. Refiguring modernism. Cambridge, MA: Harvard University Press. p. 254. ISBN 978-0-6748-3978-6.
- Stokes, J. (1989). In the Nineties. Chicago: University of Chicago Press. p. 199. ISBN 978-0-2267-7538-8.
- Sturgis, M. (2011). Walter Sickert: A Life. L.: Harper Perennial. p. 1261. ISBN 9-780-0072-0527-1.
- Sutton, D. (1976). Walter Sickert: a biography. L.: Michael Joseph. p. 272. ISBN 0-7181-1436-1.
- Turner, M. W. (2003). Backward Glances: Cruising the Queer Streets in London and New York. London and New York: Reaktion Books. p. 191. ISBN 978-1-8618-9180-8.
- Vanderlinden, W. (2002). The Art of Murder. Ripper Notes.
- Varty, А. (2007). Children and Theatre in Victorian Britain. N. Y.: Springer. p. 306. ISBN 978-0-2302-8606-1.
- Wiles, D. (2003). A Short History of Western Performance Space. Cambr.: Cambridge University Press. p. 316. ISBN 978-0-5210-1274-4.

=== Fiction ===
- West, P. (1990). "No's Knife in Yes's Throat". Conjunctions (15): 361–412. JSTOR 24515178.
