= Nelly Power =

English singer and actress

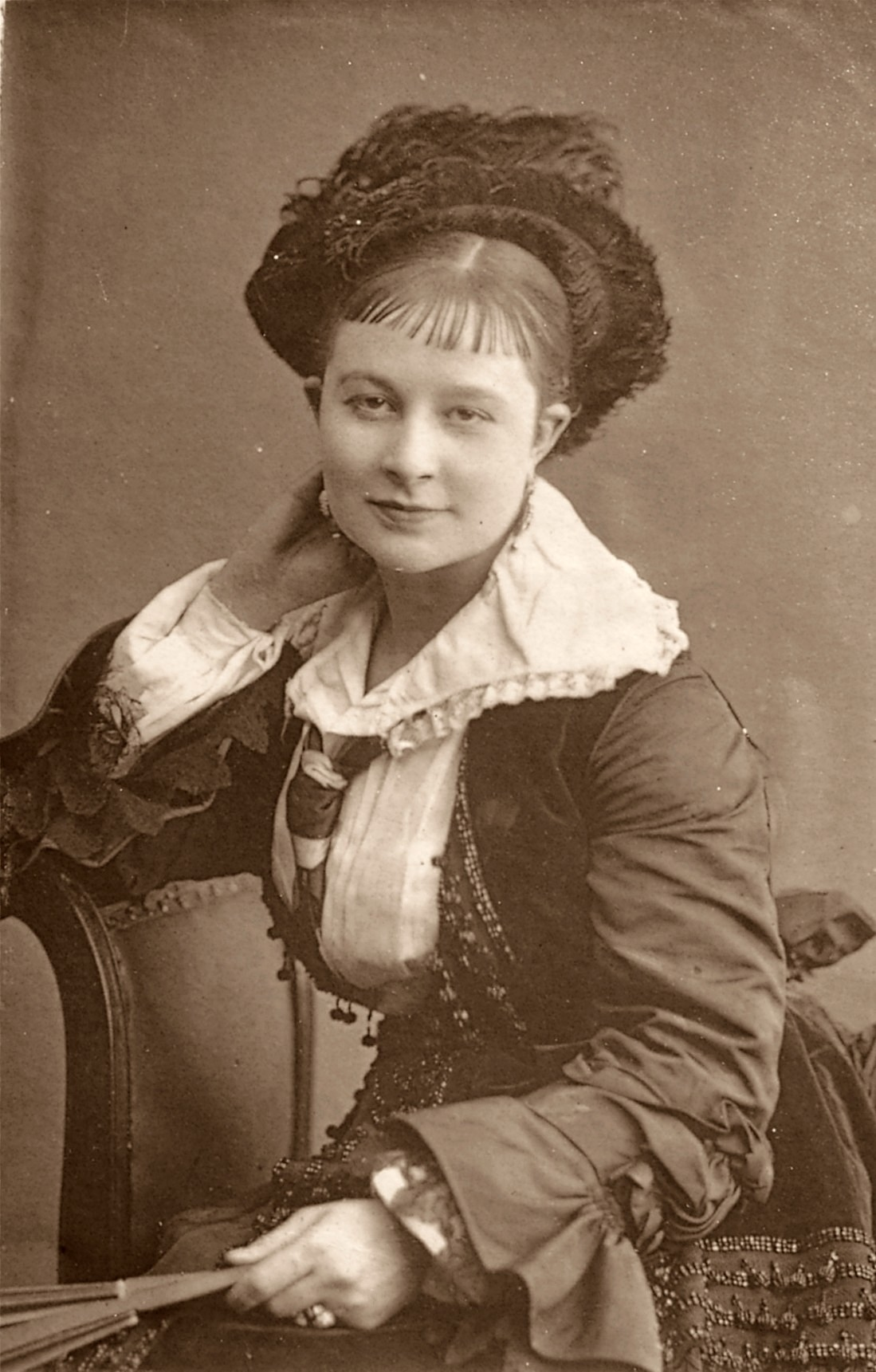
- Born: Ellen Maria Lingham; 10 April 1854; St Pancras, London, England, UK
- Died: 19 January 1887 (aged 32); Islington, London, England, UK
- Occupations: Singer and actress

Ellen Maria Lingham (10 April 1854 – 19 January 1887), known by her stage name Nelly Power, (Note: While her name is given variously as Nellie or Nelly in contemporary press reports and in advertisements for her appearances, Nelly is the name on her gravestone.) an English singer, actress and popular performer in music hall, Victorian burlesque and pantomime. Her funeral attracted three to four thousand spectators at Abney Park Cemetery and a further great crowd at the start of the procession from her home.

== Early life ==
Power was born on 10 April 1854 in St Pancras, the youngest daughter of Arthur Lingham and Agnes Lingham (née Power). Her father, a railway clerk, died less than a month before her birth. She had two older sisters who both died in childhood: Alice Sarah Adelaide (1850–1853) and Agnes (1852–1854). Power grew up with her mother, who reverted to the name Power, and a boarder, Thomas Sheppard James, who would become her mother's second husband in 1887.

== Career ==
Power was a performer in music hall from the age of 8 when, as a pupil of Mrs J W Gordon, she appeared, singing two comic songs, at Gordon's Music Hall in Southampton. She continued to sing and also performed impersonations and developed a comic style mimicking that of George Leybourne, which brought her fame by the age of 15.

She made her first appearance on the legitimate London stage in 1868 in the pantomime version of Robinson Crusoe at the Surrey Theatre. She then moved to the Vaudeville Theatre performing as principal "boy" in a number of burlesque plays by Robert Reece and Henry J. Byron: Don Carlos, Elizabeth Camaralzaman, The Orange Tree and the Bumble Bee, The Very Last Days of Pompeii, and Romulus and Remus. This was followed by a further spell in pantomime at the Surrey Theatre and the Drury Lane Theatre where, in 1881, she had the title role in the pantomime Sindbad the Sailor, with Vesta Tilley as Captain Tralala. She achieved national fame in the music halls with an act in which she caricatured dandies with comic songs such as "La-di-la". She was the original singer of "The Boy I Love Is Up in the Gallery", which was written for her by songwriter/composer George Ware.

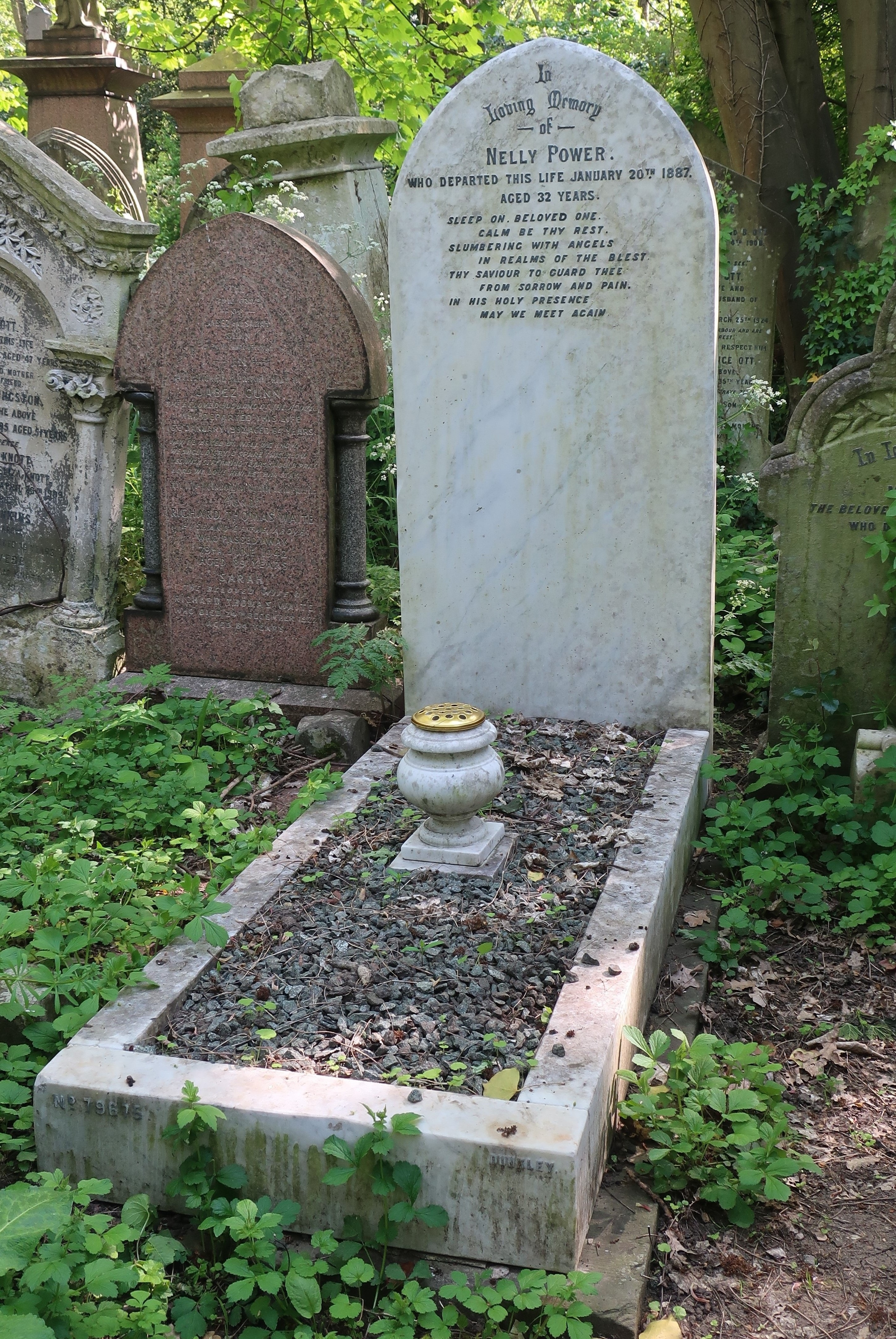
Nelly Power's grave in Abney Park Cemetery

Power died from pleurisy in 1887, aged 32, and was buried at Abney Park Cemetery in London. A commemorative blue plaque was erected in 2017 at her former home, 97 Southgate Road, Islington, by the theatre charity The Music Hall Guild of Great Britain and America.
