= The Boy I Love Is Up in the Gallery =

1885 music hall song

Song by Nelly Power
- Written: 1885
- Genre: Music hall
- Songwriter(s): George Ware
- Song made famous by Marie Lloyd

"The Boy I Love Is Up in the Gallery" (correctly The Boy in the Gallery) is a music hall song written in 1885 by George Ware for music hall star Nelly Power, and made famous by Marie Lloyd. It was also sung by Jenny Hill.

The song is unusual in that it places the singer in the actual location of the theatre, with the words traditionally directed to an imaginary beau in the cheapest seats.

== Lyrics ==
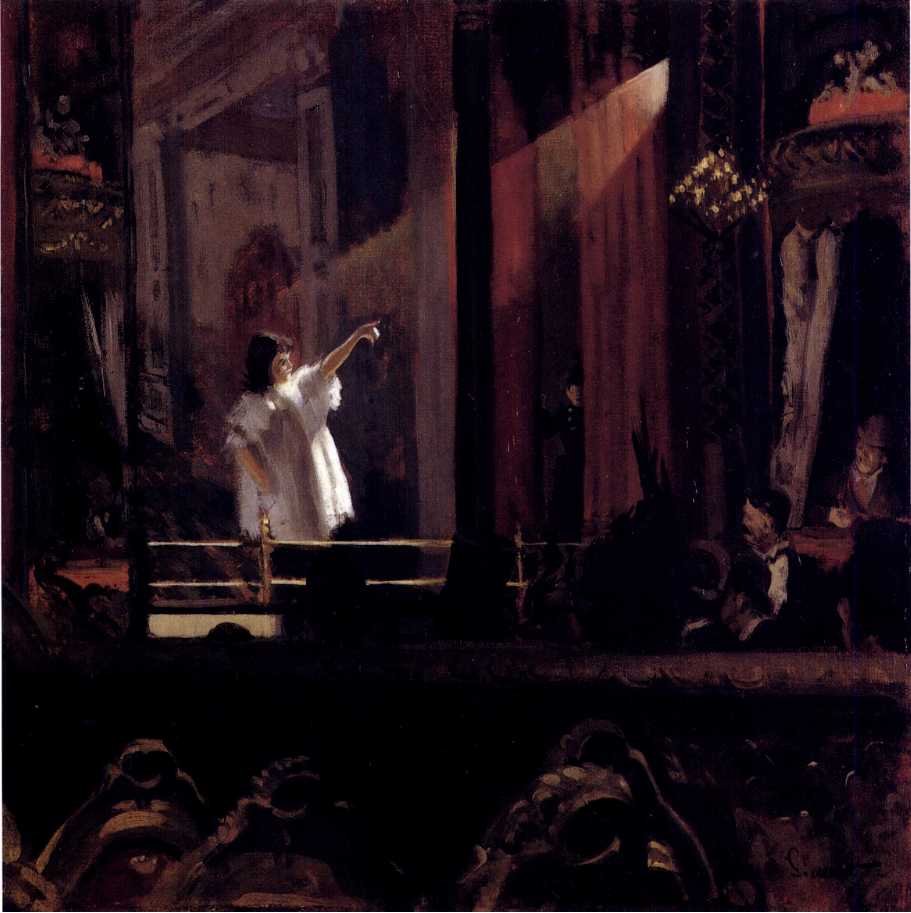
Little Dot Hetherington at the Old Bedford by Walter Sickert; c. 1888. Little Dot is singing "The Boy I Love is Up in the Gallery".

These are the lyrics in the sheet music published by EMI Music Publishing, London, 1977:

I'm a young girl, and have just come over,
Over from the country where they do things big,
And amongst the boys I've got a lover,
And since I've got a lover, why I don't care a fig.

The boy I love is up in the gallery,
The boy I love is looking now at me,
There he is, can't you see, waving his handkerchief,
As merry as a robin that sings on a tree.

The boy that I love, they call him a cobbler,
But he's not a cobbler, allow me to state.
For Johnny is a tradesman and he works in the Boro'
Where they sole and heel them, whilst you wait.

The boy I love is up in the gallery,
The boy I love is looking now at me,
There he is, can't you see, waving his handkerchief,
As merry as a robin that sings on a tree.

Now, If I were a Duchess and had a lot of money,
I'd give it to the boy who's going to marry me.
But I haven't got a penny, so we'll live on love and kisses,
And be just as happy as the birds on the tree.

The boy I love is up in the gallery,
The boy I love is looking now at me,
There he is, can't you see, waving his handkerchief,
As merry as a robin that sings on a tree.

== In popular culture ==
1940 film Gaslight features the song in a music hall scene. The lyrics prompt Anton Walbrook's character Paul Mallen to abort his date and return home to see his wife.

The 1960 film version of John Osborne's 1957 play The Entertainer features the song. It is sung by Brenda de Banzie as Phoebe Rice, wife of main character Archie Rice.

1968 film A Little Of What You Fancy has Helen Shapiro singing the song.

In 1969, Barbara Windsor sang the song in the original cast of Sing a Rude Song, a musical biography of Marie Lloyd written by Caryl Brahms and Ned Sherrin. In 1978, she performed the song as part of a Marie Lloyd medley in an episode of BBC light entertainment programme The Good Old Days.

1972 British mini-series The Edwardians features the song. Georgia Brown plays Marie Lloyd, singing the song in an episode titled "The Reluctant Juggler".

1975 British drama-series Edward the Seventh features the song. Adrienne Posta plays Marie Lloyd, singing the song in an episode titled "The Years of Waiting".

In 1977, Miss Piggy sings the song - accompanied by Rowlf on piano, and with the audience joining in - in the UK spot of the Rich Little episode of The Muppet Show.

In 1980, the song was included in the television detective series Cribb, in an episode titled "Abracadaver".

In 1990, the song was included in the television series "Oh, Mr. Toad", in an episode titled "Toad in Love".

1996 British/French film Different for Girls has Rupert Graves singing a version of the song using the word "girl" and female pronouns.

A 1999 episode of British sitcom Goodnight Sweetheart featured the song. Emma Amos played Marie Lloyd, singing the song in an episode titled "The 'Ouses in Between."

The BBC's 2007 biographical drama Miss Marie Lloyd has Jessie Wallace singing the song in the title role.

2013 British drama-series Ripper Street has Charlene McKenna singing the song in the instalment titled "Our Betrayal: Part 2".

The song was featured in Season 1, Episode 1 of the BBC Two series Peaky Blinders. Original air date was September, 12, 2013 but it was filmed in 2012. The character who sings it, Grace Burgess, is played by Annabelle Wallis, whose ancestor Marie Lloyd originally made the song famous.

The 2018 film The Happy Prince has Rupert Everett singing the song in the role of Oscar Wilde.

The song featured in a 2018 episode of CBBC TV series Hetty Feather, based on the novel by Jacqueline Wilson. Polly Allen's character Sheila Ormsby briefly sings it in the eighth episode of Series 4 in order to win the title of Festival Queen.
