= George Ware (songwriter) =

George Ware (24 July 1829 – 30 December 1895) was an English singer, songwriter and theatrical agent.

Born in Shoreditch, London, he spent some time as a sailor and as a soldier, before taking to the stage as a singer. He first established his reputation at the Oriental Music Hall in Poplar, and became well-known during the 1850s as "the extraordinary three-voiced singer", who could sing alto, tenor and bass. He began writing songs and found popular success with "The House That Jack Built", performed by Sam Cowell, and "The Whole Hog or None", performed by E. W. Mackney, a song to which numerous topical verses were added.

Ware also worked as a booking agent for Phineas T. Barnum, and established himself as a manager of theatres and music halls. He was in regular contact with music hall proprietors around the world, and organised tours for some of the leading acts. He also managed acts including Mackney, Katie Lawrence, Arthur Lloyd, and Nelly Power, for whom he wrote "The Boy I Love is Up in the Gallery" in 1885. When he heard the 15-year-old Marie Lloyd singing the song, he signed her up as one of his leading performers.

He died in Holborn, London in 1895, aged 66.
