= Charles E. Peterson =

American preserver (1906–2004)

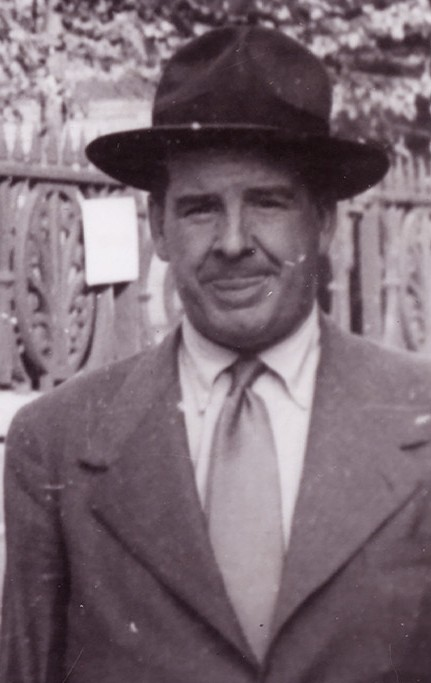
Charles E. Peterson at Independence National Historical Park in the 1950s

Charles E. Peterson (1906 – 2004) was an American architect and preservationist, known for professionalizing the standards of historic preservation in the United States. He made important contributions to the knowledge of early American building practices, and has been called the "founding father" of the profession of historic preservationist, and the "godfather of preservation." He helped to create the profession of the preservation architect, and passionately advocated for the retention and restoration of America's built heritage. According to Jacques Dalibard, a professor at McGill University School of Architecture: "[W]ith James Marston Fitch, I cannot think of two people who had more influence on historic preservation in North America."

During his long career, Peterson received numerous awards for his work, including the National Trust for Historic Preservation's Louise du Pont Crowninshield Award (1966), the American Institute of Architects (AIA) Medal for "vision and determination" (1979), and the AIA's Presidential Citation (1990). The AIA inducted him into its College of Fellows in 1962. He was also a founder of the Association for Preservation Technology International (APT), and served as its first president.

== Early career ==
Peterson was raised in Madison, Minnesota, and received his bachelor's degree in architecture in 1928 from the University of Minnesota. In 1929, he began a thirty-three year tenure with the National Park Service. In 1931, his efforts were instrumental in saving the Moore House in Yorktown, Virginia, the site of the 1781 British surrender. While documenting this building, Peterson created the prototype for the Historic American Buildings Survey's historic structure report, the basic format of which is still in use.

=== 1930 Profile ===
Charles E. Peterson, whose Monterey sketches and paintings appear this month, was born in Madison, Minnesota, and graduated from the high school there in 1924. He received the degree of Bachelor of Arts and Architecture in the University of Minnesota and won distinction for his design of a Memorial Chapel in the 1928 Paris Prize First Preliminaries. Young Peterson has traveled extensively in the western national parks and forests on surveying parties. He came to San Francisco in July 1928, to take the U. S. Civil Service examination which resulted in his appointment as assistant architect in the Division of Landscape Architecture, National Park Service. He is a member of the Phi Kappa Sigma, the Pi Alpha National Honorary Art Fraternity and the National Collegiate Players.

As an NPS landscape architect, Peterson worked on the pre-World War II iterations of the Jefferson National Expansion Memorial in St. Louis Missouri. He advocated for the preservation of historic buildings within the proposed park's 40-block area, and for the creation of a National Building Museum.

Peterson is perhaps best remembered for establishing the Historic American Buildings Survey (HABS), a federal documentation program that is still active and which spawned the Historic American Engineering Record and the Historic American Landscape Survey. On November 13, 1933, while he was chief landscape architect for the Eastern Division for the National Park Service, Peterson wrote a memo to the NPS director which became the charter for the program. Peterson successfully obtained funding for HABS from the Civil Works Administration the following month. HABS targeted unemployed architects, draftsmen, and photographers to make as complete a record as possible of "the rapidly disappearing examples of early architecture and historic structures throughout the country." This program was credited as "the first major step upon the part of the Federal Government toward the cataloging and preservation of historic structures." The first HABS survey work began in January 1934 and later that year was formalized as a joint agreement with the American Institute of Architects and the Library of Congress. The HABS program has continued nearly unabated to the present.

During his life, Peterson constantly advocated for HABS, and was instrumental in restarting the program in 1957 and later saved it from oblivion when the Reagan administration threatened to pull funding. The end result was a stronger program with greatly increased funding.

== Independence National Historical Park and Society Hill ==
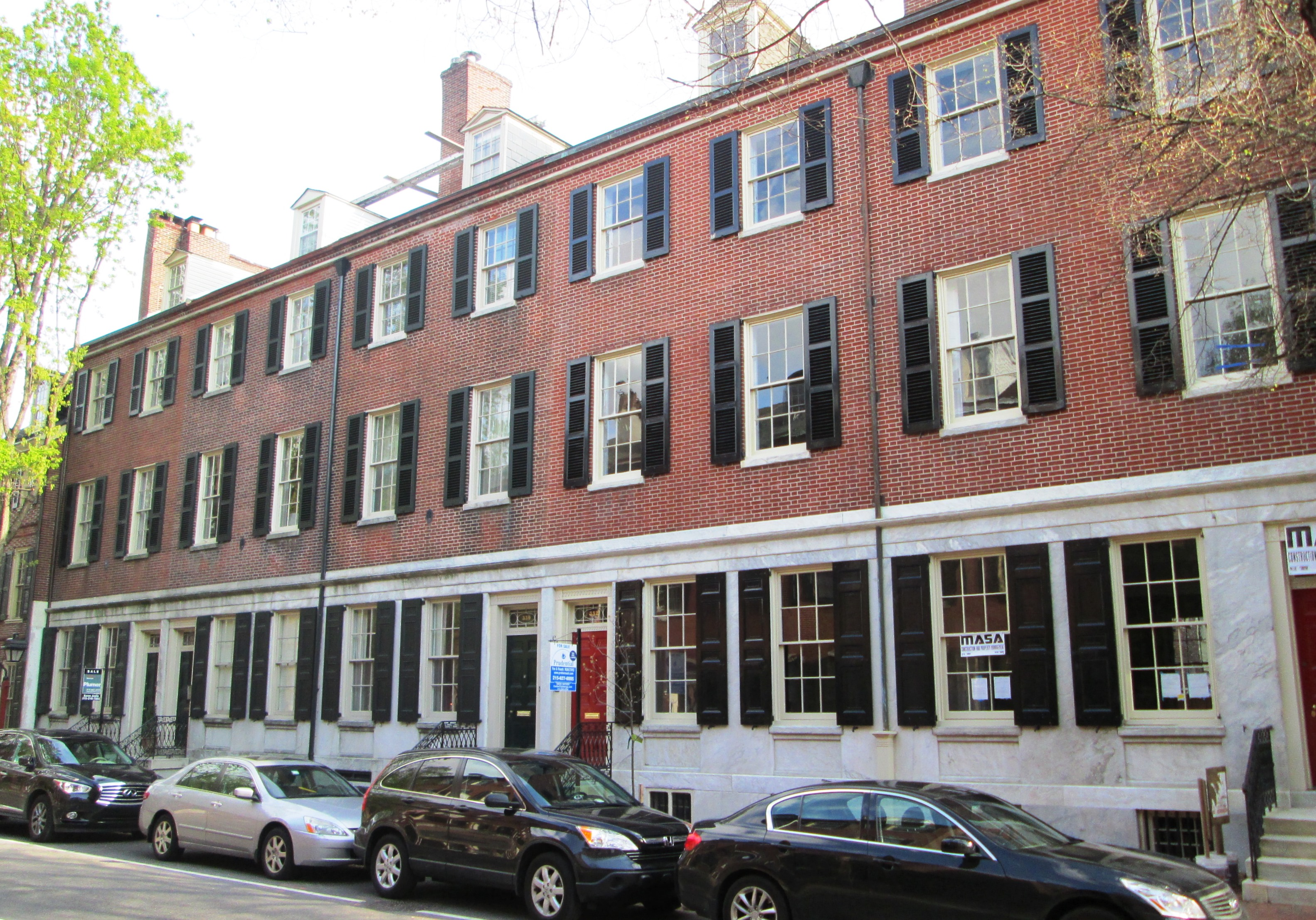
In the 1950s, Peterson restored two of the five Federal townhouses of Girard Row (built 1831-1833), in Philadelphia's renamed Society Hill neighborhood. His own house was at 332 Spruce (second from right).

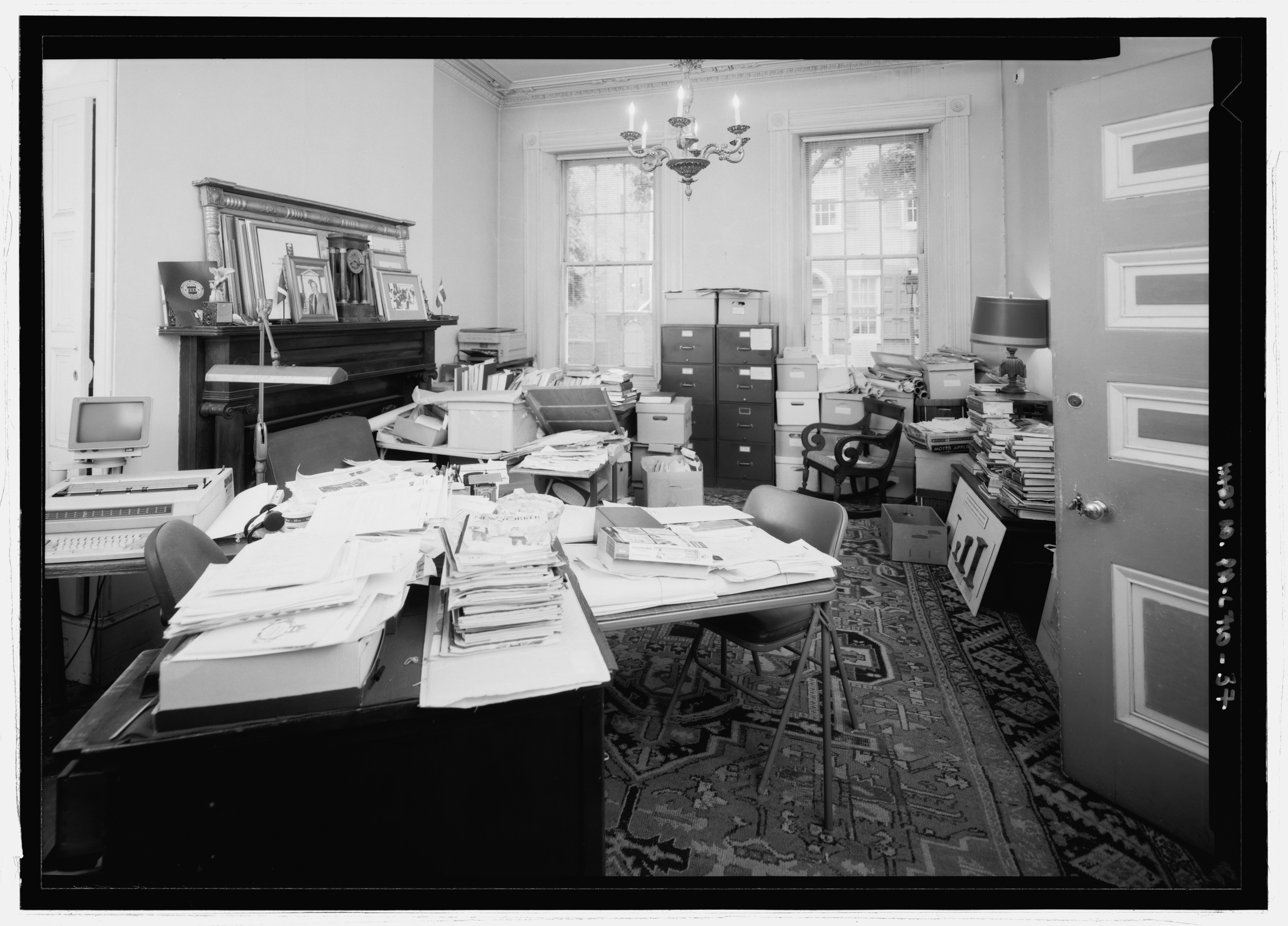
Peterson's office in the Girard-Peterson House, 332 Spruce Street, Philadelphia. HABS, 2003, Jack E. Boucher, photographer

Peterson and NPS historian Roy E. Appelman were assigned to Philadelphia in early 1947 to advise the Philadelphia National Shrines Park Commission on the boundaries and buildings to be included in the national park being proposed for the area surrounding Independence Hall. Peterson was the uncredited primary author and editor of the Shrines Commission's 7-volume final report to Congress (December 1947), which was incorporated into the enabling legislation under which Independence National Historical Park was formally created on July 4, 1956.

Peterson returned to Philadelphia in the early 1950s to work at what would become INHP. He advised on the restoration of Carpenters' Hall, and on the re-creation of the exterior of Library Hall by the American Philosophical Society. Peterson directed much of the preservation-related activity by the National Park Service within the region.

It was during this period that the Commonwealth of Pennsylvania demolished the 19th- and early-20th-century buildings on the three blocks north of Independence Hall to create an open European-style mall. The only building spared from demolition was the Free Quaker Meetinghouse (1783), built by members of the Society of Friends who, contrary their faith, supported the Revolutionary War. Peterson documented the meetinghouse, and oversaw the building's minor relocation to accommodate the widening of 5th Street and Arch Street. Independence Mall remained a state park until the 1990s, when the 40-year bonds that had funded its construction were retired, and the land was deeded to INHP.

Even by the early 1950s, Philadelphia's oldest neighborhoods had not recovered from the 1930s Great Depression, and many of their historic buildings lay neglected or abandoned. Peterson successfully advocated for the neighborhood south and east of Independence Hall to be renamed "Society Hill," after the Free Society of Traders, who had invested in and developed Philadelphia beginning in the 1680s. In 1954, Peterson purchased and restored two of the houses in Girard Row, a line of five row houses that financier Stephen Girard had built in the early 1830s. Peterson's tireless preservation advocacy helped to secure the revitalization of Society Hill by motivating friends and acquaintances to buy and restore properties there. Today, it is one of the city's most desirable neighborhoods.

Peterson opposed the demolition of important 19th-century buildings within INHP, but did not prevail. He retired from the National Park Service in 1962, but continued to live in Philadelphia, working as a preservation consultant from his Federal Era row house on Spruce Street. During Peterson's 33-year tenure with the National Park Service and for decades beyond, he remained a passionate advocate for historic preservation.

== Career highlights ==
The 1960s were an extremely productive time for Peterson. He contributed to many scholarly conferences, including the Second International Congress of Architects and Technicians of Historical Monuments in Venice in 1964. It was at this conference that the enormously influential Venice Charter was created, which established much of preservation philosophy that exists to this day and has become ingrained in the National Park Service's Secretary of the Interior's Standards for preservation. Peterson, along with the entire U.S. delegation rejected the charter, however, due to its European focus and the radical emphasis on preservation instead of restoration. In the 1960s, restoration—defined as the "scraping" of later layers of historic fabric in order to restore the appearance of a building to an arbitrary date—was the status quo and represented the majority of preservation work in the United States. The Venice Charter was a radical shift in preservation philosophy that would not become fully accepted in the United States until the 1980s. Peterson also served on the Committee on Principles and Guidelines for Historic Preservation established by the National Trust which helped influence the future direction of the preservation movement. In the mid-1960s, Peterson was appointed as an adjunct professor to the fledgling historic preservation program at Columbia University where he taught early- American building technology. He worked closely with James Marston Fitch to build this program into the first graduate degree program in historic preservation in the country. Columbia's program became the model which spawned the tens of graduate and undergraduate programs in historic preservation that now exist across the United States. In 1970, Peterson established the European Traveling Summer School for Restorationists that allowed architects to view and participate in restoration projects outside the United States.

Peterson was a founding member of the Association for Preservation Technology International (APT), which was created in 1968 in an effort to provide better education for the restoration, documentation, and preservation of historic buildings. He became the organization's first president in 1969. APT was enormously influential as it represented the first scholarly outlet for the activities of historic preservation. Peterson's activities through APT helped move preservation from an antiquarian hobby to a professional endeavor.

Throughout his career, Peterson was an avid researcher on the history of American building technology. He is best known for his work on Robert Smith, a colonial-era architect/builder which culminated in the publication of his book Robert Smith (1722-1777): Architect, Builder and Patriot by The Athenaeum of Philadelphia and the Carpenters' Company of Philadelphia in 2000. Other topics that Peterson covered included the early architecture of the Mississippi River valley, the use of iron in roofs, the development of the I-beam, and the recovery of the "lost" history of cement and concrete construction.

In 1983, Peterson established the Charles E. Peterson Prize to be awarded to students displaying superior drawing abilities in documenting HABS buildings. Managed by The Athenaeum of Philadelphia, the prize is awarded by HABS, the Athenaeum, and the AIA. He also donated all of his research papers and books to the University of Maryland in 1998, having in 1981 endowed a substantial fund to support scholarly research in American Architecture prior to 1860 at The Athenaeum of Philadelphia and gifted his Archive and Library of Early American Building Technology and Historic Preservation.

Peterson is credited as an architect of Colonial National Historical Park, Jamestown and Yorktown, Virginia, listed on the National Register of Historic Places

== Creation of the profession of the preservation architect ==
According to many contemporary preservation architects, Peterson "almost singlehandedly invented and developed the profession of historical architect." In a similar vein he is considered to be "the father of modern restoration techniques." From his start with the National Park Service in the 1930s, Peterson continually advocated for training of architects in the proper restoration of buildings that respected their history, technology, and authenticity. A continual theme of his was the inadequacy of most architects' work on historic buildings:

The shortcomings of architects in the field of historical restoration began long ago. It became clear, even in the days of Latrobe, that the most talented designers could not always be trusted around important landmarks. ... Some of our most stylish architects have proposed—and have carried out—gruesome butcheries on historic buildings. ... The architectural profession should police its own ranks, if for no reason than that many laymen have done their homework in history (as a hobby) and are today well ahead of architects.

Peterson explained that there are very few people who understand older buildings and how they are constructed and "as a result, things happen to historic buildings that should not happen to a doghouse."

He believed that architects could not learn from books and drawings, but had to experience buildings directly: "The man who doesn't get his hands dirty on the job will never know enough." Peterson's work in this regard has helped inspire training programs for architects, such as that offered by the Heritage Conservation Network, that provide hands-on training in various techniques from documentation to pointing with lime mortar.

== Legacy ==
Peterson's legacy is defined by his advocacy for the establishment of historic preservation as a formal professional discipline. He contributed significantly to the development of standards for architectural documentation and professional training. Consequently, the foundations of modern degree programs in historic preservation are frequently attributed to his early initiatives. Lastly, Peterson established a scholarly basis for building interventions. No longer was an antiquarian aesthetic ethic acceptable for historic preservation; all work had to be documented and changes well substantiated with historical records.

The January 2006 issue of the Association for Preservation Technology International's APT Bulletin featured remembrances of Peterson by his colleagues.
