= Plaster =

Broad range of building and sculpture materials

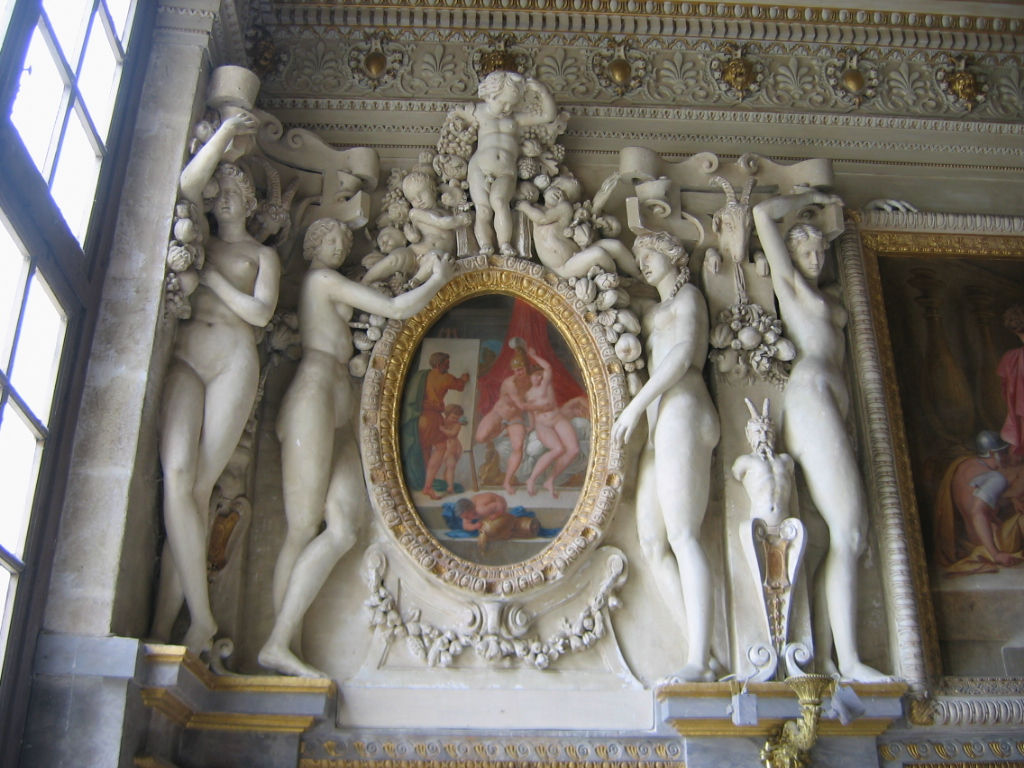
plaster reliefs, such as this work at the Château de Fontainebleau, were hugely influential in Northern Mannerism. A plaster low-relief decorative frieze is above it.

Plaster is a building material typically used for cladding on interior walls, pool interiors, ceilings and for moulding and casting decorative elements. In English, "plaster" usually means a material used for the interiors of buildings, while "render" commonly refers to external applications. The term stucco refers to a physically different mixture commonly used for exterior building wall cladding.

The most common types of plaster mainly contain either gypsum, lime, or cement, but all work in a similar way. The plaster is manufactured as a dry powder and is mixed with water to form a stiff but workable paste immediately before it is applied to the surface. The reaction with water liberates heat through crystallization and the hydrated plaster then hardens.

Plaster can be relatively easily worked with metal tools and sandpaper and can be moulded, either on site or in advance, and worked pieces can be put in place with adhesive. Plaster is suitable for finishing rather than load-bearing, and when thickly applied for decoration may require a hidden supporting framework.

Forms of plaster have several other uses. In medicine, plaster orthopedic casts are still often used for supporting set broken bones. In dentistry, plaster is used to make dental models by pouring the material into dental impressions. Various types of models and moulds are made with plaster. In art, lime plaster is the traditional matrix for fresco painting; the pigments are applied to a thin wet top layer of plaster and fuse with it so that the painting is actually in coloured plaster. In the ancient world, as well as the sort of ornamental designs in plaster relief that are still used, plaster was also widely used to create large figurative reliefs for walls, though few of these have survived.

== History ==
Plaster was first used as a building material and for decoration in the Middle East at least 5,000 years ago. In Egypt, gypsum was burned in open fires, crushed into powder, and mixed with water to create plaster, used as a mortar between the blocks of pyramids and to provide a smooth wall facing. In Jericho, a cult arose where human skulls were decorated with plaster and painted to appear lifelike. The Romans brought plaster-work techniques to Europe.

== Types ==
=== Clay plaster ===
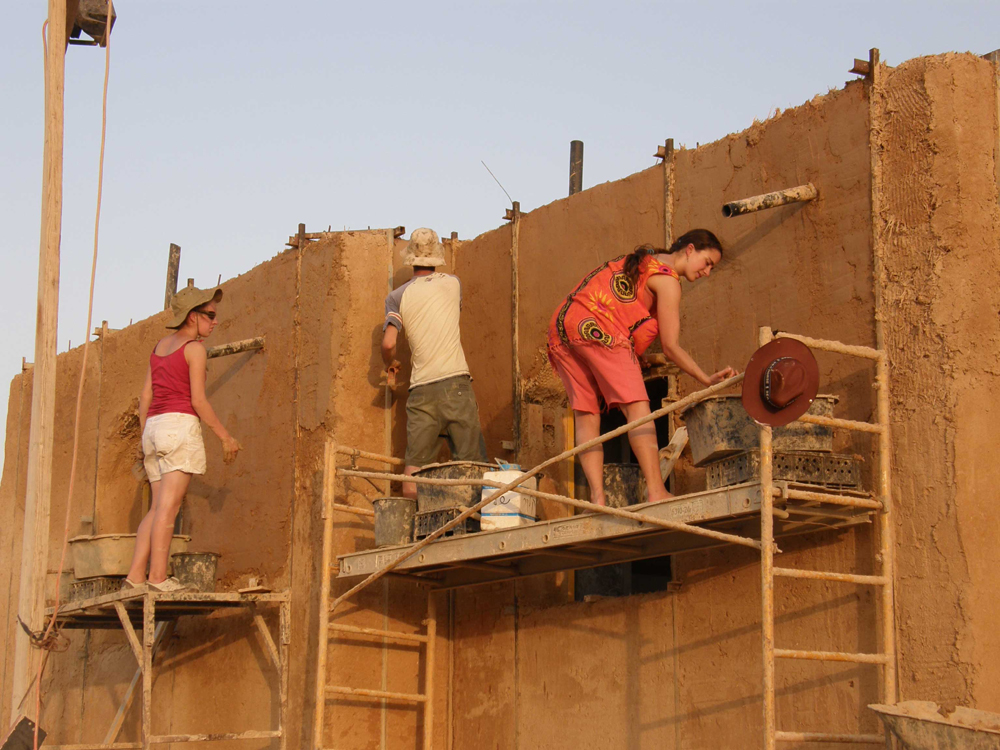
Applying mud plaster to an outside wall

Clay plaster is a mixture of clay, sand and water often with the addition of plant fibers for tensile strength over wood lath.

Clay plaster has been used around the world at least since antiquity. Settlers in the American colonies used clay plaster on the interiors of their houses: "Interior plastering in the form of clay antedated even the building of houses of frame, and must have been visible in the inside of wattle filling in those earliest frame houses in which … wainscot had not been indulged. Clay continued in use long after the adoption of laths and brick filling for the frame." Where lime was not easily accessible it was rationed and usually substituted with clay as a binder. In Martin E. Weaver's seminal work he says, "Mud plaster consists of clay or earth which is mixed with water to give a 'plastic' or workable consistency. If the clay mixture is too plastic it will shrink, crack and distort on drying. Sand, fine gravels and fibres were added to reduce the concentrations of fine clay particles which were the cause of the excessive shrinkage." Manure was often added for its fibre content. In some building techniques straw or grass was used as reinforcement.

In the Earliest European settlers' plasterwork, a mud plaster was used McKee wrote, of a circa 1675 Massachusetts contract that specified the plasterer, "Is to lath and siele the four rooms of the house betwixt the joists overhead with a coat of lime and haire upon the clay; also to fill the gable ends of the house with ricks and plaister them with clay. 5. To lath and plaster partitions of the house with clay and lime, and to fill, lath, and plaister them with lime and haire besides; and to siele and lath them overhead with lime; also to fill, lath, and plaster the kitchen up to the wall plate on every side. 6. The said Daniel Andrews is to find lime, bricks, clay, stone, haire, together with laborers and workmen." Records of the New Haven colony in 1641 mention clay and hay as well as lime and hair also. In German houses of Pennsylvania the use of clay persisted.

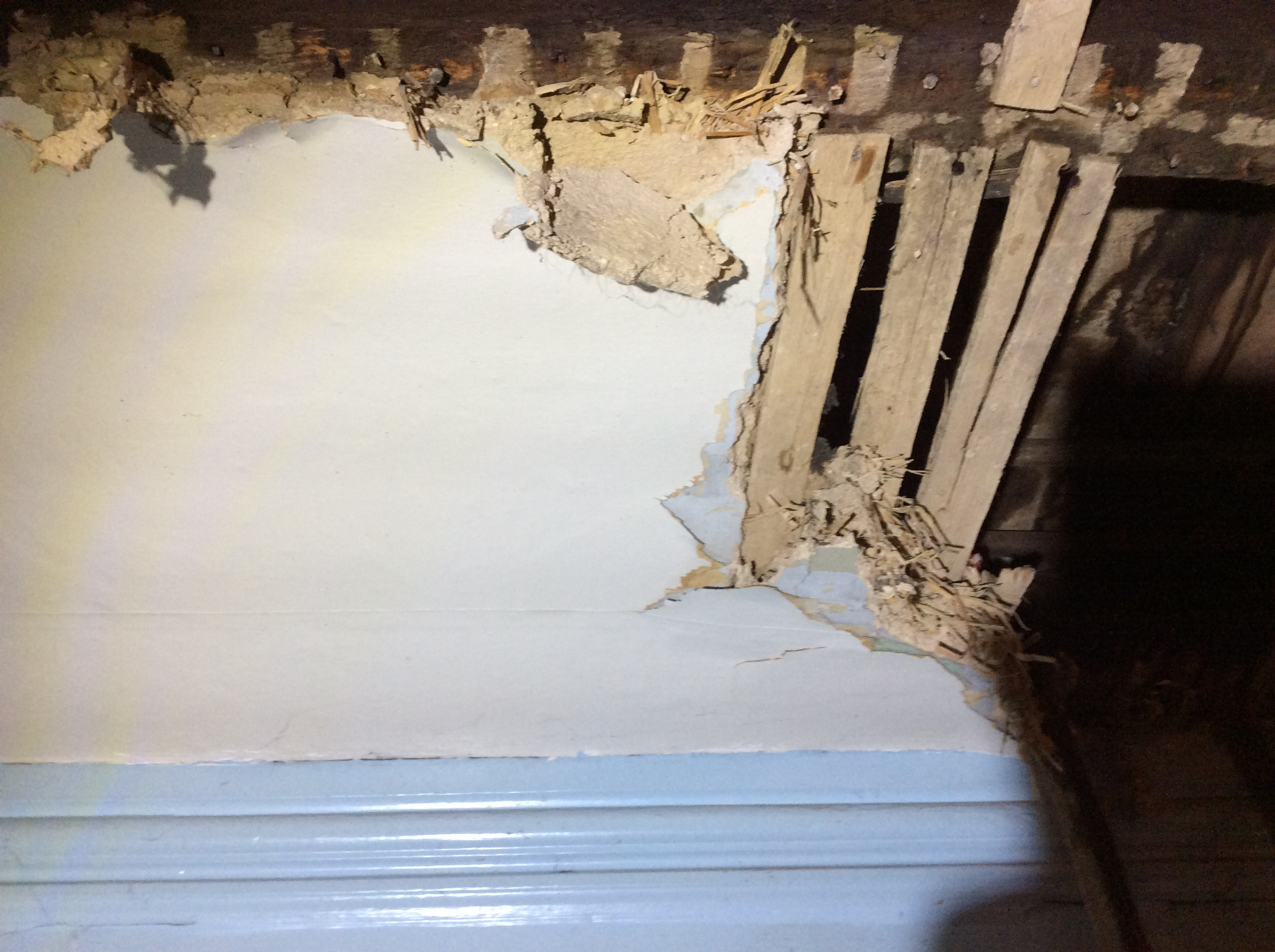
Clay plaster base coat on split oak lath held in place with straw and manure, covered with a lime plaster top coat, Old Economy Village, Pennsylvania (1827)

Old Economy Village is one such German settlement. The early Nineteenth-Century utopian village in present-day Ambridge, Pennsylvania, used clay plaster substrate exclusively in the brick and wood frame high architecture of the Feast Hall, Great House and other large and commercial structures as well as in the brick, frame and log dwellings of the society members. The use of clay in plaster and in laying brickwork appears to have been a common practice at that time not just in the construction of Economy village when the settlement was founded in 1824. Specifications for the construction of, "Lock keepers houses on the Chesapeake and Ohio Canal, written about 1828, require stone walls to be laid with clay mortar, excepting 3 inches on the outside of the walls … which (are) to be good lime mortar and well pointed." The choice of clay was because of its low cost, but also the availability. At Economy, root cellars dug under the houses yielded clay and sand (stone), or the nearby Ohio river yielded washed sand from the sand bars; and lime outcroppings and oyster shell for the lime kiln.

The surrounding forests of the new village of Economy provided straight grain, old-growth oak trees for lath. Hand split lath starts with a log of straight grained wood of the required length. The log is split into quarters and then smaller and smaller bolts with wedges and a sledge. When small enough, a froe and mallet were used to split away narrow strips of lath. Farm animals provided hair and manure for the float coat of plaster. Fields of wheat and grains provided straw and hay to reinforce the clay plaster. But there was no uniformity in clay plaster recipes.

Manure provides fiber for tensile strength as well as protein adhesive. Unlike casein used with lime plaster, hydrogen bonds of manure proteins are weakened by moisture. With braced timber-framed structures clay plaster was used on interior walls and ceilings as well as exterior walls as the wall cavity and exterior cladding isolated the clay plaster from moisture penetration. Application of clay plaster in brick structures risked water penetration from failed mortar joints on the exterior brick walls. In Economy Village, the rear and middle wythes of brick dwelling walls are laid in a clay and sand mortar with the front wythe bedded in a lime and sand mortar to provide a weather proof seal to protect from water penetration. This allowed a rendering of clay plaster and setting coat of thin lime and fine sand on exterior-walled rooms.

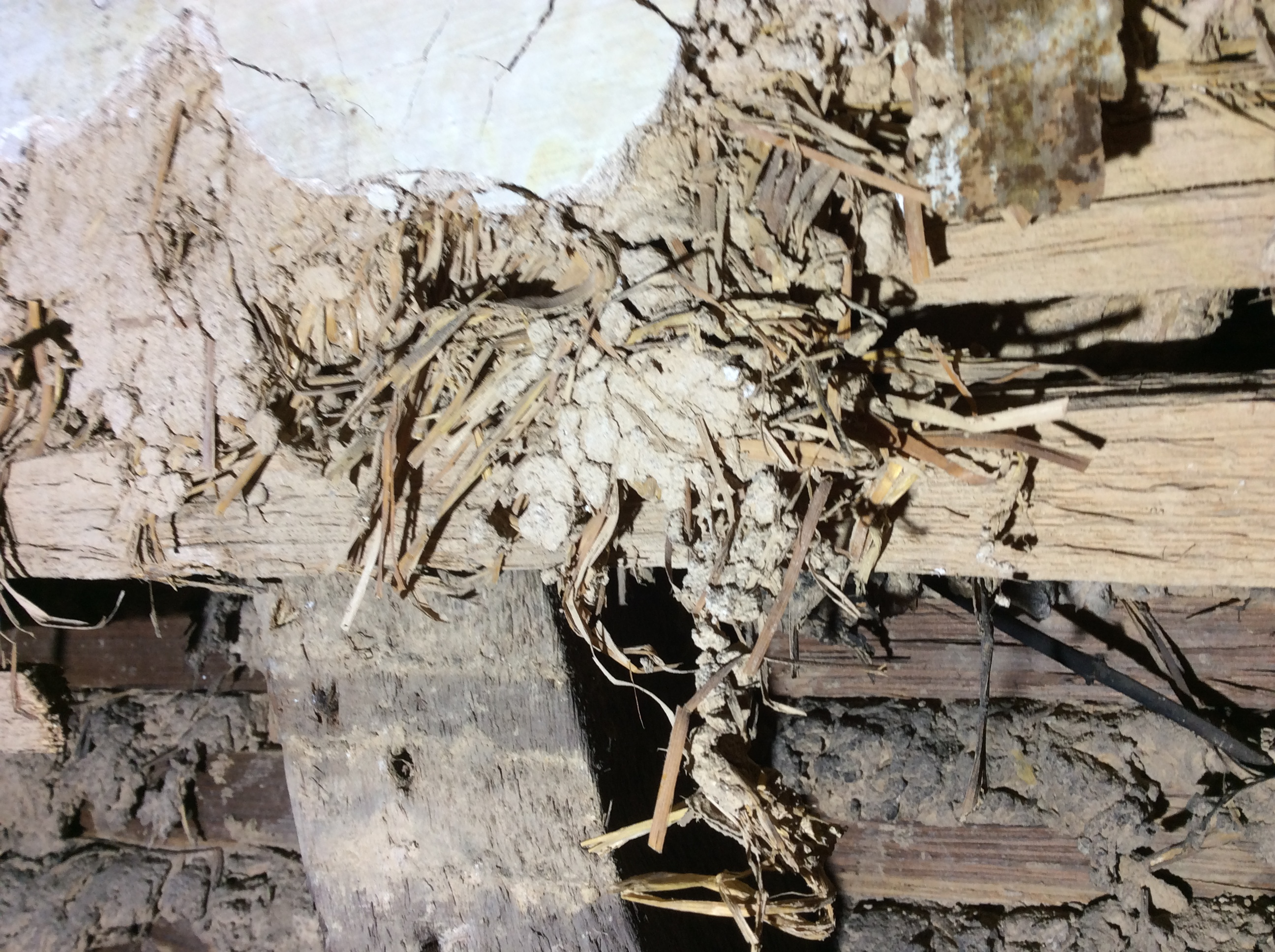
Lime setting-coat on clay plaster with straw binder. Applied to hand-split lath over a timber framed wall of a brick family house at Old Economy Village, Pennsylvania

Split lath was nailed with square cut lath nails, one into each framing member. With hand split lath the plasterer had the luxury of making lath to fit the cavity being plastered. Lengths of lath two to six foot are not uncommon at Economy Village. Hand split lath is not uniform like sawn lath. The straightness or waviness of the grain affected the thickness or width of each lath, and thus the spacing of the lath. The clay plaster rough coat varied to cover the irregular lath. Window and door trim as well as the mudboard (baseboard) acted as screeds. With the variation of the lath thickness and use of coarse straw and manure, the clay coat of plaster was thick in comparison to later lime-only and gypsum plasters. In Economy Village, the lime top coats are thin veneers often an eighth inch or less attesting to the scarcity of limestone supplies there.

Clay plasters with their lack of tensile and compressive strength fell out of favor as industrial mining and technology advances in kiln production led to the exclusive use of lime and then gypsum in plaster applications. However, clay plasters still exist after hundreds of years clinging to split lath on rusty square nails. The wall variations and roughness reveal a hand-made, textured alternative to machine-made modern substrate finishes, but clay plaster finishes are rare and fleeting. According to Martin Weaver, "Many of North America's historic building interiors … are all too often … one of the first things to disappear in the frenzy of demolition of interiors which has unfortunately come to be a common companion to 'heritage preservation' in the guise of building rehabilitation."

=== Gypsum plaster ===
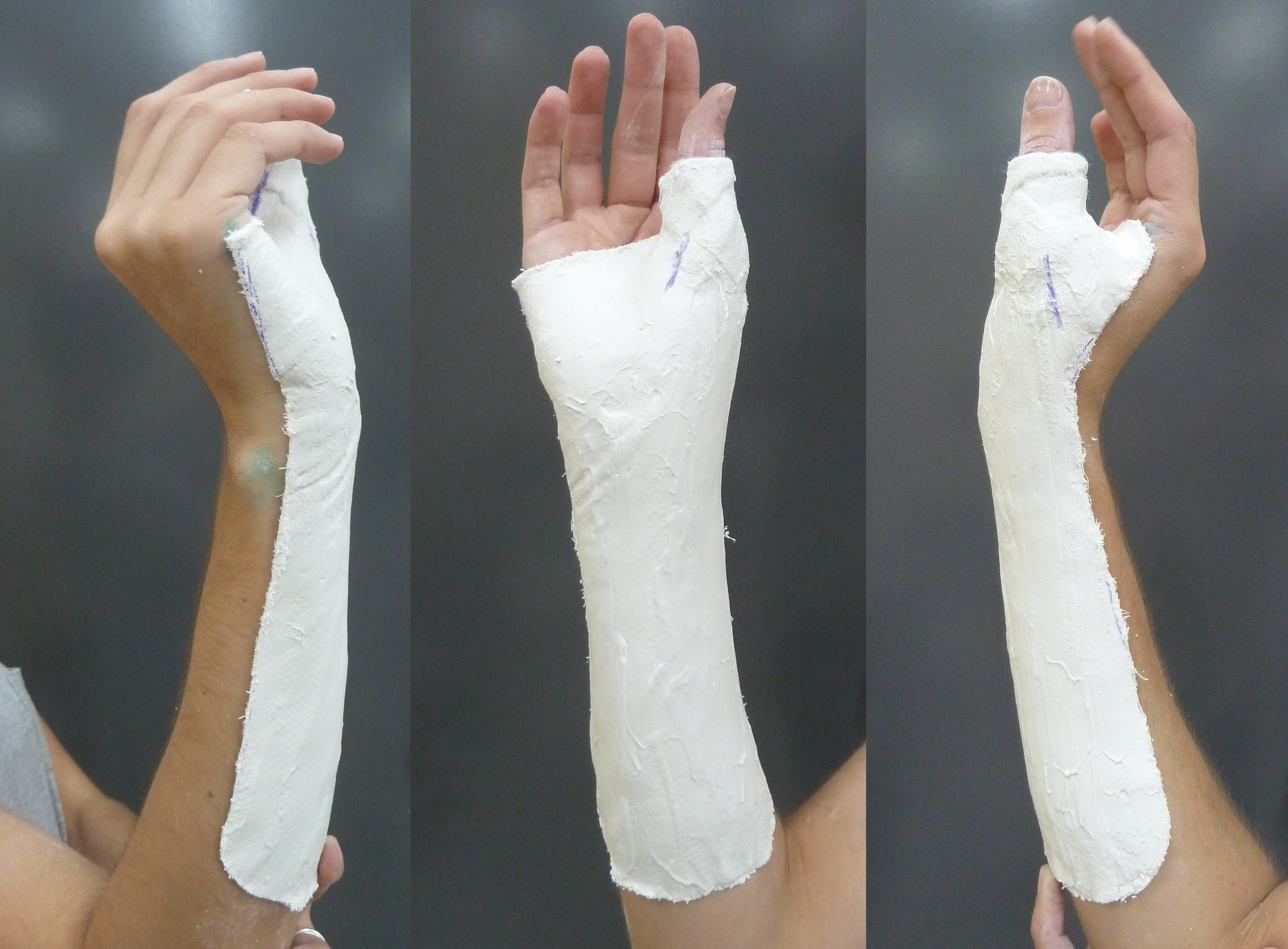
An orthopedic cast for the hand made out of gypsum plaster

Gypsum plaster, also known as plaster of Paris, is a white powder consisting of calcium sulfate hemihydrate. The natural form of the compound is the mineral bassanite. Although it is created out of gypsum, the powder is not itself gypsum, which is calcium sulfate dihydrate rather than hemihydrate.

The name "plaster of Paris" was given because it was originally made by heating gypsum from a large deposit at Montmartre, a hill in the north end of Paris.

Gypsum plaster is produced by heating gypsum to about 120–180 °C (248–356 °F) in a kiln:

$$\ce{CaSO4.2H2O \overset{heat}{{}->{}} {CaSO4.1/2H2O} + 1\!1/2 H2O ^}$$

(the water is released as steam).

Plaster of Paris has a notable property of setting into a hard mass on wetting with water.

$$\ce{CaSO4.1/2H2O + 1 1/2H2O -> CaSO4.2H2O}$$

Plaster of Paris is stored in moisture-proof containers, because the presence of moisture can cause slow setting of plaster of Paris by bringing about its hydration, which will make it useless after some time.

When the dry plaster powder is mixed with water, it rehydrates over time into gypsum. The setting of plaster slurry starts about 10 minutes after mixing and is complete in about 45 minutes. The setting of plaster of Paris is accompanied by a slight expansion of volume. It is used in making casts for statues, toys, and more. The initial matrix consists mostly of orthorhombic crystals: the kinetic product. Over the next 72 hours, the rhombic crystals give way to an interlocking mass of monoclinic crystal needles, and the plaster increases in hardness and strength. If plaster or gypsum is heated to between 130 and 180 °C (266 and 356 °F), hemihydrate is formed, which will also re-form as gypsum if mixed with water.

On heating to 180 °C (356 °F), the nearly water-free form, called γ-anhydrite (CaSO_{4}·nH_{2}O where n = 0 to 0.05) is produced. γ-anhydrite reacts slowly with water to return to the dihydrate state, a property exploited in some commercial desiccants. On heating above 250 °C (482 °F), the completely anhydrous form called β-anhydrite or dead burned plaster is formed.

Uses include:

- For making surfaces like the walls of a house smooth before painting them and for making ornamental designs on the ceilings of houses and other buildings.
- For making toys, decorative materials, cheap ornaments, cosmetics, and black-board chalk.
- A fire-proofing material.
- An orthopedic cast is used in hospitals for setting fractured bones in the right position to ensure correct healing and avoid nonunion. When plaster of Paris is mixed with the proper amount of water and applied around the fractured limb, it sets into a hard mass, thereby keeping the bones in a fixed position. It is also used for making casts in dentistry.

=== Lime plaster ===
Lime plaster is a mixture of calcium hydroxide and sand (or other inert fillers). Carbon dioxide in the atmosphere causes the plaster to set by transforming the calcium hydroxide into calcium carbonate (limestone). Whitewash is based on the same chemistry.

To make lime plaster, limestone (calcium carbonate) is heated above approximately 850 °C (1,560 °F) to produce quicklime (calcium oxide). Water is then added to produce slaked lime (calcium hydroxide), which is sold as a wet putty, or white powder. Additional water is added to form a paste prior to use. The paste may be stored in airtight containers. When exposed to the atmosphere, the calcium hydroxide slowly turns back into calcium carbonate through a reaction with atmospheric carbon dioxide, causing the plaster to become stronger.

Lime plaster was a common building material for wall surfaces used in a process known as lath and plaster, whereby a series of wooden strips on a studwork frame was covered with a semi-dry plaster that hardened into a surface. The plaster used in most lath and plaster construction was mainly lime plaster, with a cure time of about a month. To stabilize the lime plaster during curing, small amounts of plaster of Paris were incorporated into the mix. Because plaster of Paris sets quickly, retardants were used to slow setting time enough to allow workers to mix large quantities of lime plaster putty. A modern form of this method uses expanded metal mesh over wood or metal structures, which allows a great freedom of design as it is adaptable to both simple and compound curves. Today, this building method has been partly replaced with drywall, which is also composed mostly of gypsum plaster. In both of these methods, a primary advantage of the material is that it is resistant to fire within a room and so can assist in reducing or eliminating structural damage or destruction, provided the fire is promptly extinguished.

Lime plaster is used for frescoes, where pigments, diluted in water, are applied to the wet plaster.

USA and Iran are the main plaster producers in the world.

=== Cement plaster ===
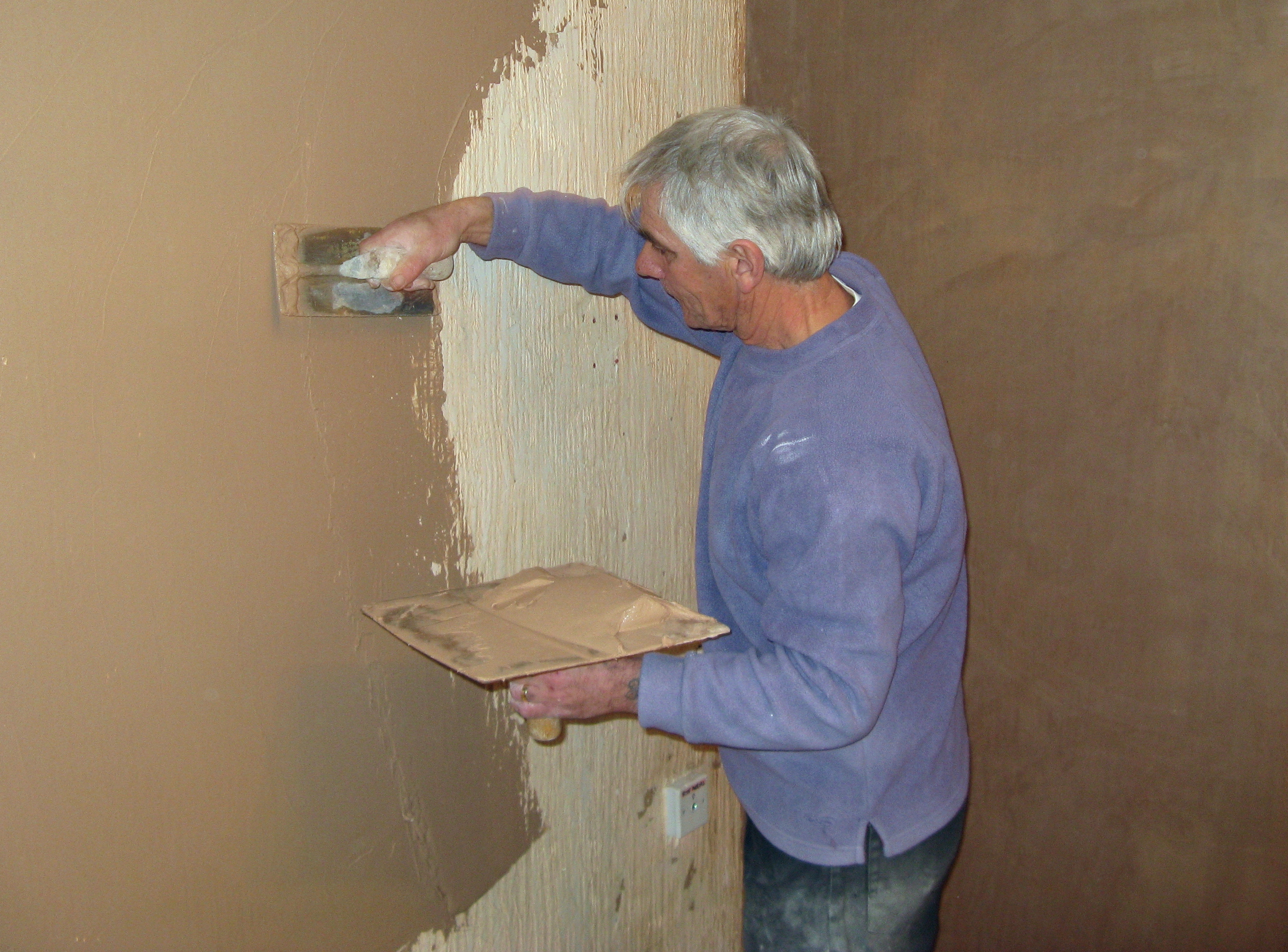
Plastering an internal wall

Cement plaster is a mixture of suitable plaster, sand, Portland cement, and water, which is applied to masonry interiors and exteriors to achieve a smooth surface. Interior surfaces sometimes receive a final layer of gypsum plaster. Walls constructed with stock bricks are normally plastered, while face brick walls are not. Various cement plasters are used as proprietary spray fireproofing products. These usually use vermiculite as lightweight aggregate. Heavy versions of such plasters are used for exterior fireproofing to protect LPG vessels, pipe bridges, and vessel skirts.

Cement plaster was first introduced in America around 1909 and was often called adamant plaster after a prominent manufacturer of the time. The advantages of cement plaster noted at that time were its strength, hardness, quick setting time, and durability.

=== Heat-resistant plaster ===
Heat-resistant plaster is a building material used for coating walls and chimney breasts, and for use as a fire barrier in ceilings. It replaces conventional gypsum plasters in cases where the temperature can get too high for gypsum plaster to stay on the wall or ceiling.

An example of a heat-resistant plaster composition is a mixture of Portland cement, gypsum, lime, exfoliated insulating aggregate (e.g., perlite and vermiculite, or mica), phosphate shale, adhesive binder (such as Gum karaya), and a detergent (such as sodium dodecylbenzene sulfonate).

== Applications ==
=== In decorative architecture ===
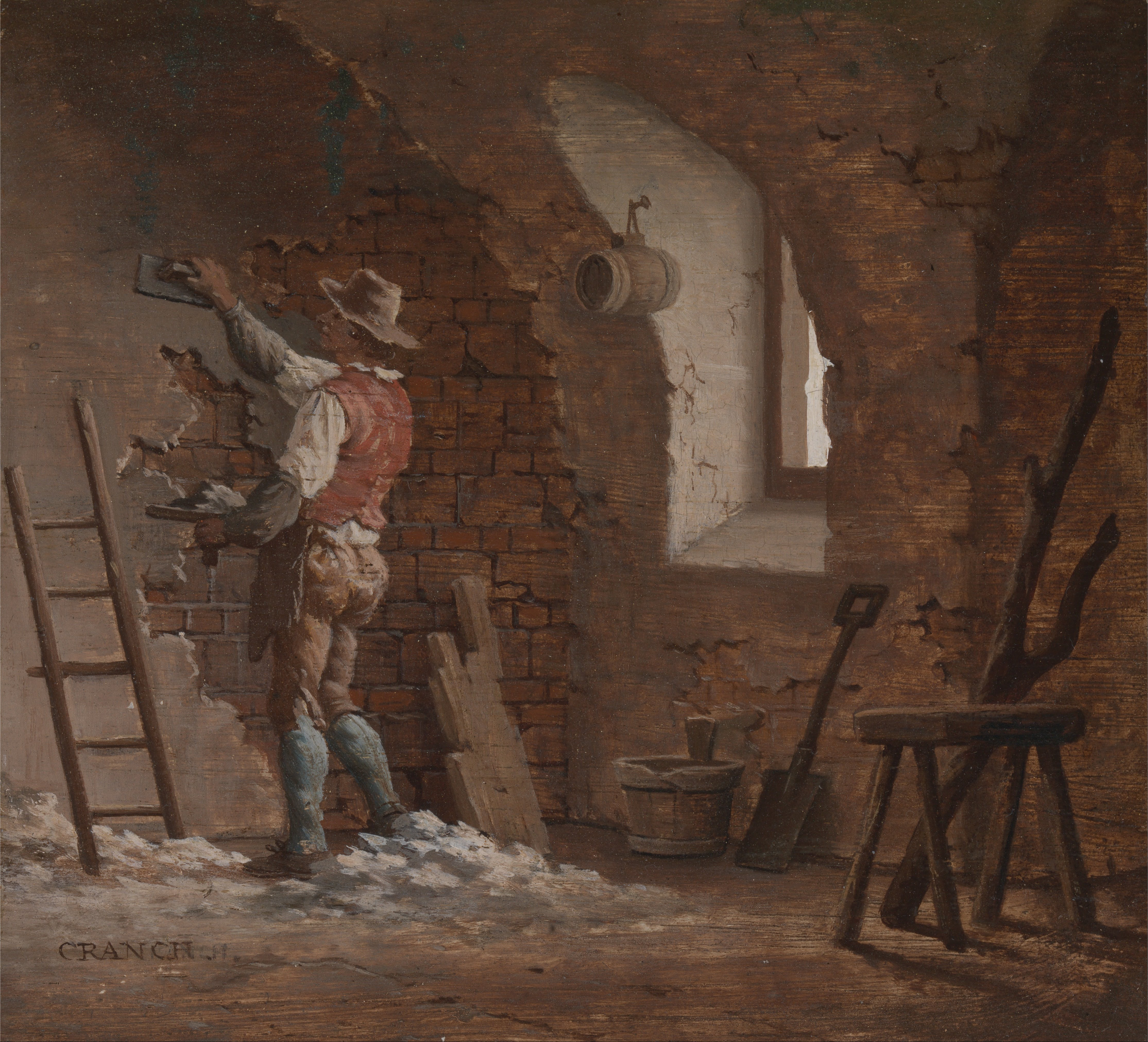
Early 19th Century plasterer at work – painting by John Cranch (1751–1821)

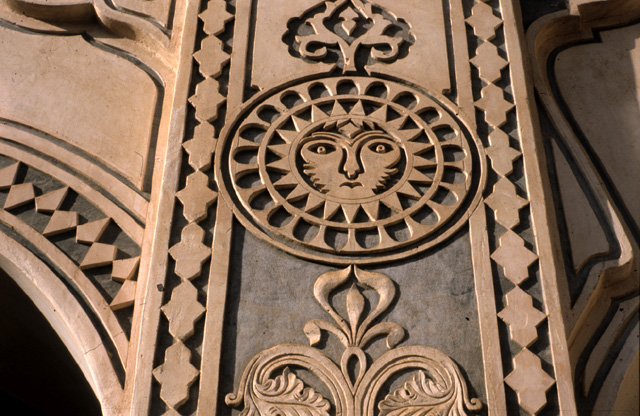
19th century stucco plasterwork from House of Borujerdies in Kashan, Iran

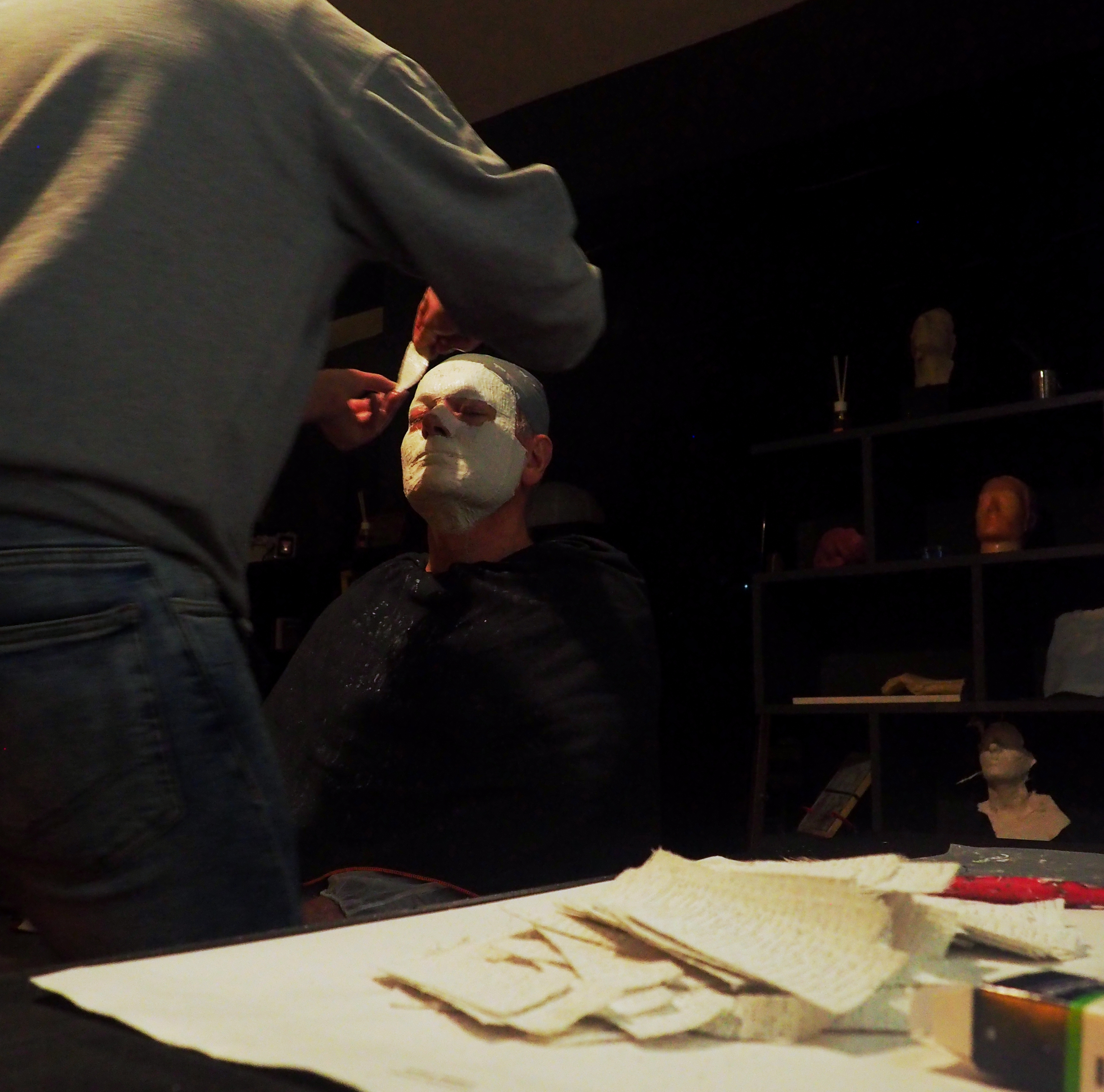
Face plaster casting bandage application

Plaster may be used to create complex detailing for use in room interiors. These may be geometric (simulating wood, or stone), or naturalistic (simulating leaves, vines, and flowers). These are often used to simulate the wood or stone detailing found in more substantial buildings.

This material is used for false ceiling. In this application, the powder is converted into a sheet form, which is attached to the basic ceiling with fasteners. The common use of this plaster is in the construction of houses. Post-construction, direct painting is possible (which is commonly seen in French architecture), but elsewhere plaster is used. The walls are painted with the plaster, which in some countries is nothing but calcium carbonate. After drying, the calcium carbonate plaster turns white, then the wall is ready to be painted. Elsewhere in the world, such as the UK, ever finer layers of plaster are added on top of the plasterboard (or sometimes the brick wall directly) to give a smooth, brown, polished texture ready for painting.

=== Art ===
Example of a stenciled plaster design

Mural paintings are commonly painted onto a plaster secondary support. Some, like Michelangelo's Sistine Chapel ceiling, are executed in fresco, meaning they are painted on a thin layer of wet plaster, called intonaco. The pigments sink into this layer, so that the plaster itself becomes the medium holding them, which accounts for the excellent durability of fresco. Additional work may be added a secco on top of the dry plaster, though this is generally less durable.

Plaster (often called stucco in this context) is a far easier material for making reliefs than stone or wood. It was widely used for large interior wall-reliefs in Egypt and the Near East from antiquity into Islamic times (latterly for architectural decoration, as at the Alhambra), Rome, and Europe from at least the Renaissance. It needs very good conditions to survive long in unmaintained buildings. Roman decorative plasterwork is mainly known from Pompeii and other sites buried by ash from Mount Vesuvius.

Plaster may be cast directly into a damp clay mold. In creating this, piece molds (molds designed for making multiple copies) or waste molds (for single use) would be made of plaster. This "negative" image may be used to produce clay productions, which when fired in a kiln become terra cotta building decorations, or these may be used to create cast concrete sculptures. If a plaster positive was desired, this would be constructed or cast to form a durable image artwork. As a model for stonecutters, this would be sufficient. If intended for producing a bronze casting, the plaster positive could be further worked to produce smooth surfaces. An advantage of this plaster image is that it is relatively cheap. Should a patron approve of the durable image and be willing to bear further expense, subsequent molds could be made for the creation of a wax image to be used in lost wax casting: a far more expensive process. In lieu of producing a bronze image suitable for outdoor use, the plaster image may be painted to resemble a metal image; such sculptures are suitable only for presentation in a weather-controlled environment.

Plaster expands while hardening, then contracts slightly just before hardening completely. This makes plaster excellent for use in molds, and it is often used as an artistic material for casting. Plaster is also commonly spread over a form made of wire mesh, cloth, or other materials: a process for adding raised details. For these processes, limestone or acrylic based plaster may be employed, known as stucco.

Products composed mainly of plaster of Paris and a small amount of Portland cement are used for casting sculptures and other art objects as well as molds. Considerably harder and stronger than straight plaster of Paris, these products are for indoor use only as they degrade in moist conditions.

=== Medicine ===
Plaster is widely used as a support for broken bones. A bandage impregnated with plaster is moistened and then wrapped around the damaged limb, setting into a close-fitting yet easily removed tube, known as an orthopedic cast.

Plaster is also used in preparation for radiotherapy when fabricating individualized immobilization shells for patients. Plaster bandages are used to construct an impression of a patient's head and neck, and liquid plaster is used to fill the impression and produce a plaster bust. The transparent material polymethyl methacrylate (Plexiglas, Perspex) is then vacuum formed over this bust to create a clear face mask which will hold the patient's head steady while radiation is being delivered.

In dentistry, plaster is used for mounting casts or models of oral tissues. These diagnostic and working models are usually made from dental stone, a stronger, harder, and denser derivative of plaster which is manufactured from gypsum under pressure. Plaster is also used to invest and flask wax dentures, the wax being subsequently removed by "burning out" and replaced with flowable denture base material. The typically acrylic denture base then cures in the plaster investment mold. Plaster investments can withstand the high heat and pressure needed to ensure a rigid denture base. In dentistry there are 5 types of gypsum products, depending on their consistency and uses: 1) impression plaster (type 1), 2) model plaster (type 2), dental stones (types 3, 4, and 5)

In orthotics and prosthetics, plaster bandages traditionally were used to create impressions of the patient's limb (or residuum). This negative impression was then, itself, filled with plaster of Paris, to create a positive model of the limb and used in fabricating the final medical device.

In addition, dentures (false teeth) are made by first taking a dental impression using a soft, pliable material that can be removed from around the teeth and gums without loss of fidelity and using the impression to creating a wax model of the teeth and gums. The model is used to create a plaster mold (which is heated so the wax melts and flows out) and the denture materials are injected into the mold. After a curing period, the mold is opened and the dentures are cleaned and polished.

=== Fire protection ===
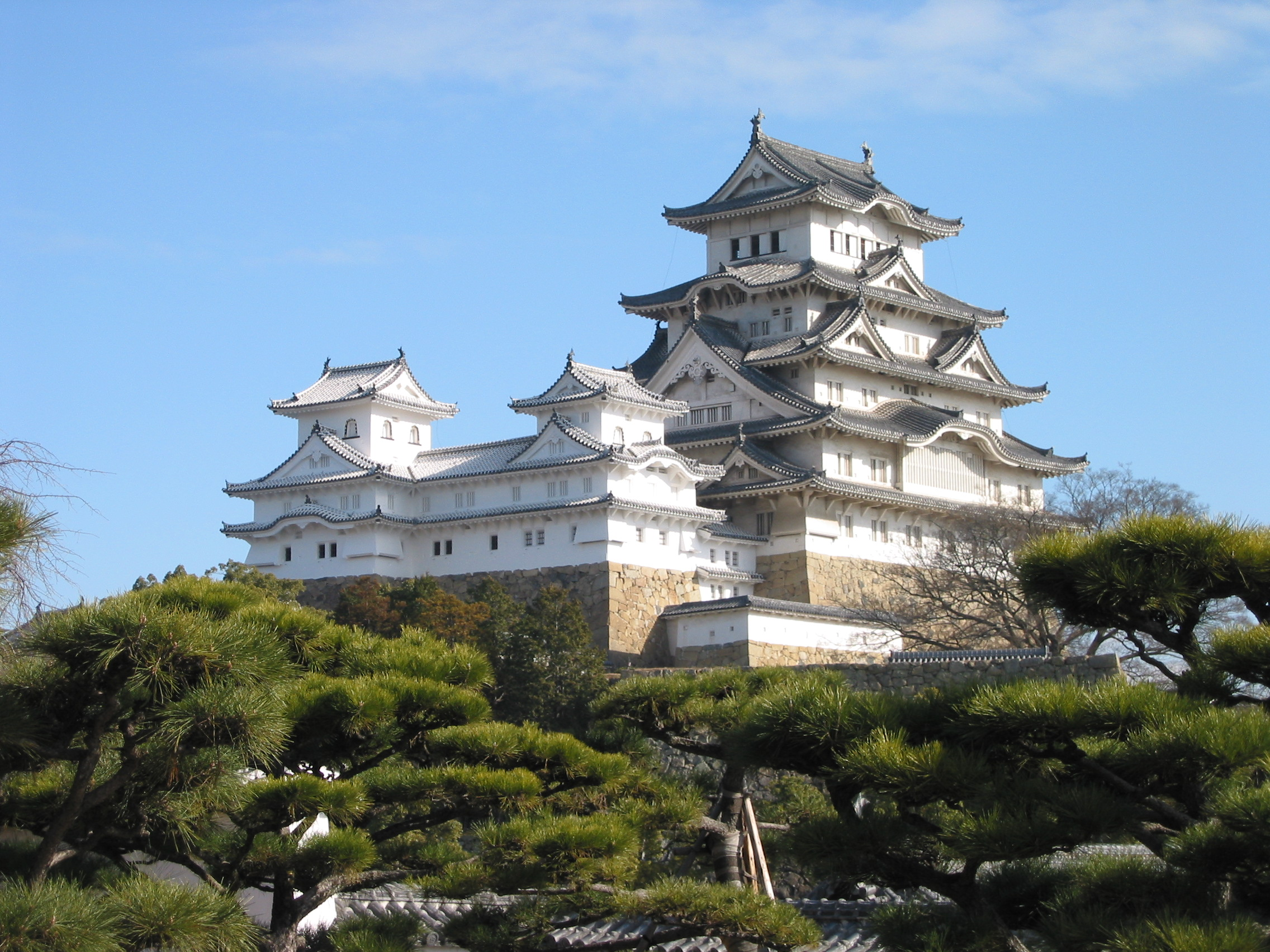
Himeji Castle, Himeji, Hyogo Prefecture, Japan

Plasters have been in use in passive fire protection, as fireproofing products, for many decades.

Gypsum plaster releases water vapor when exposed to flame, acting to slow the spread of the fire, for as much as an hour or two depending on thickness. Plaster also provides some insulation to retard heat flow into structural steel elements, that would otherwise lose their strength and collapse in a fire. Early versions of protective plasters often contain asbestos fibres, which since have been outlawed in many industrialized nations.

Recent plasters for fire protection contain cement or gypsum as binding agents, as well as mineral wool or glass fiber to add mechanical strength. Vermiculite, polystyrene beads, or chemical expansion agents are often added to decrease the density of the finished product and increase thermal insulation.

Interior fireproofing products are typically less substantial, with lower densities and lower cost. Exterior fireproofing products have to withstand harsher environmental conditions. A rough surface is typically forgiven inside of buildings, as dropped ceilings often hide them. Fireproofing plasters are losing ground to more costly intumescent and endothermic products on technical merit. Cementitious and gypsum based plasters tend to be endothermic. Fireproofing plasters are closely related to firestop mortars.

=== Gallery ===
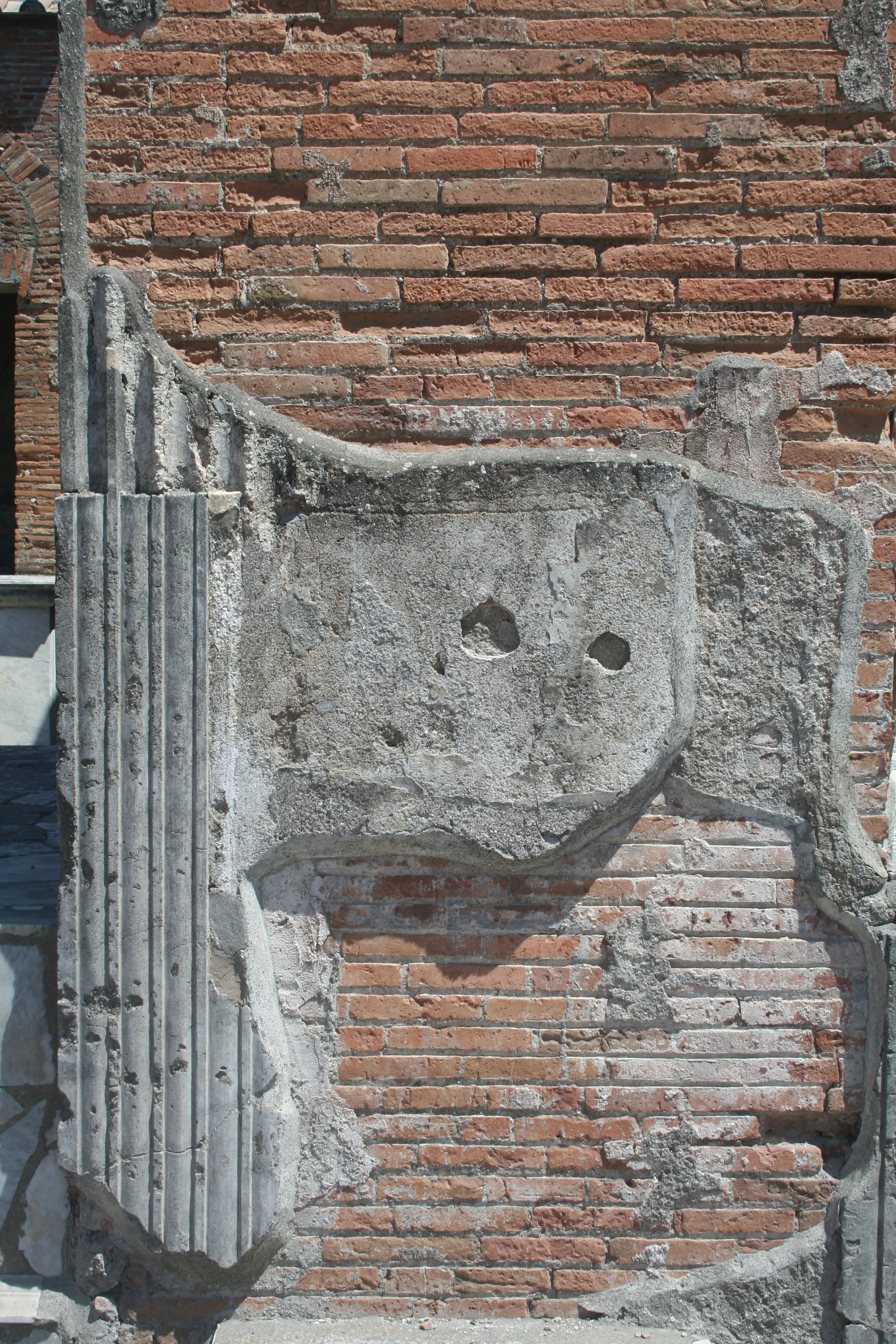
Plasterwork in Pompeii (79 AD)

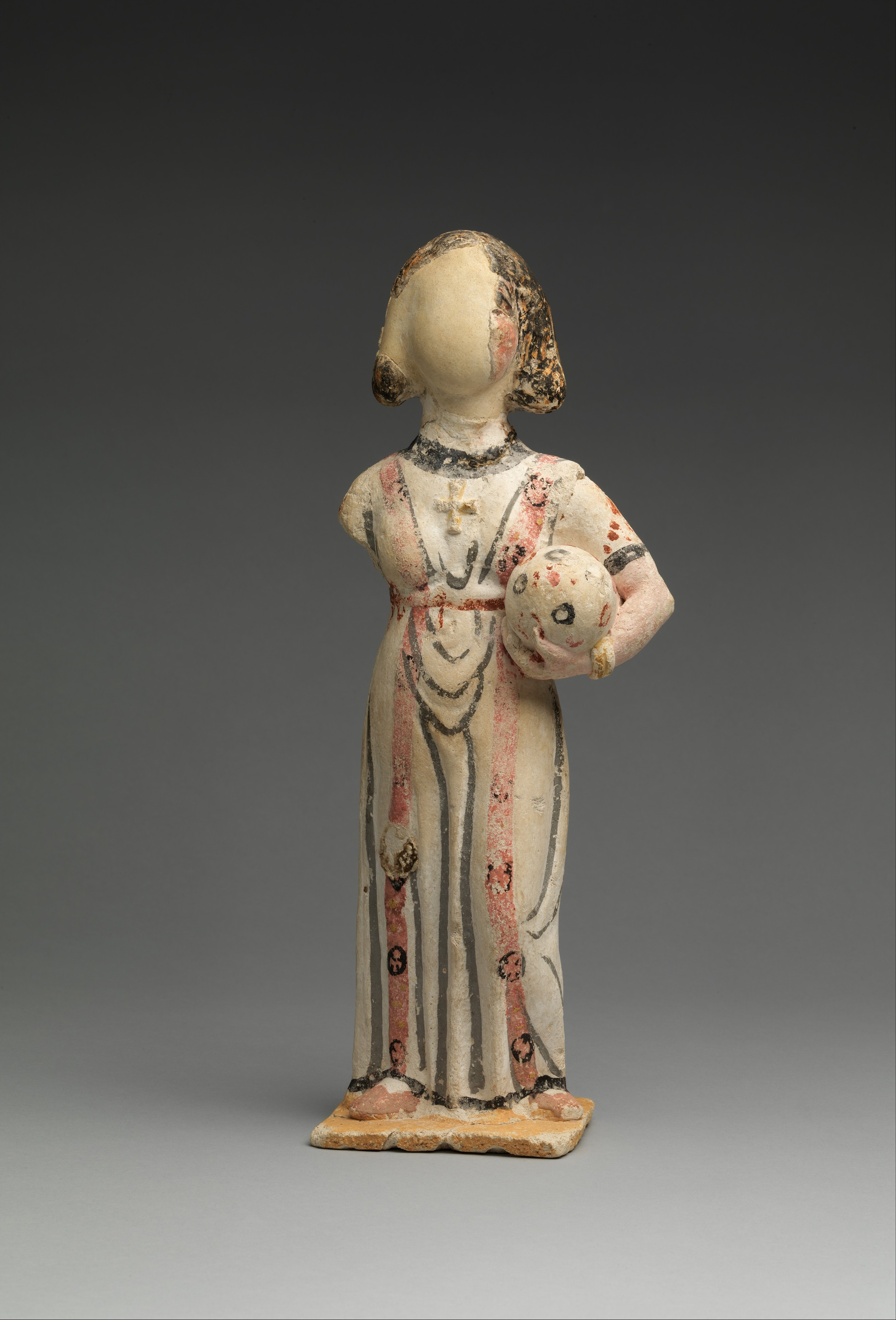
Figure of a woman; 5th century; painted plaster; height: 38.4 cm (15.1 in), width: 14.7 cm (5.8 in), depth: 9.6 cm (3.8 in); Metropolitan Museum of Art

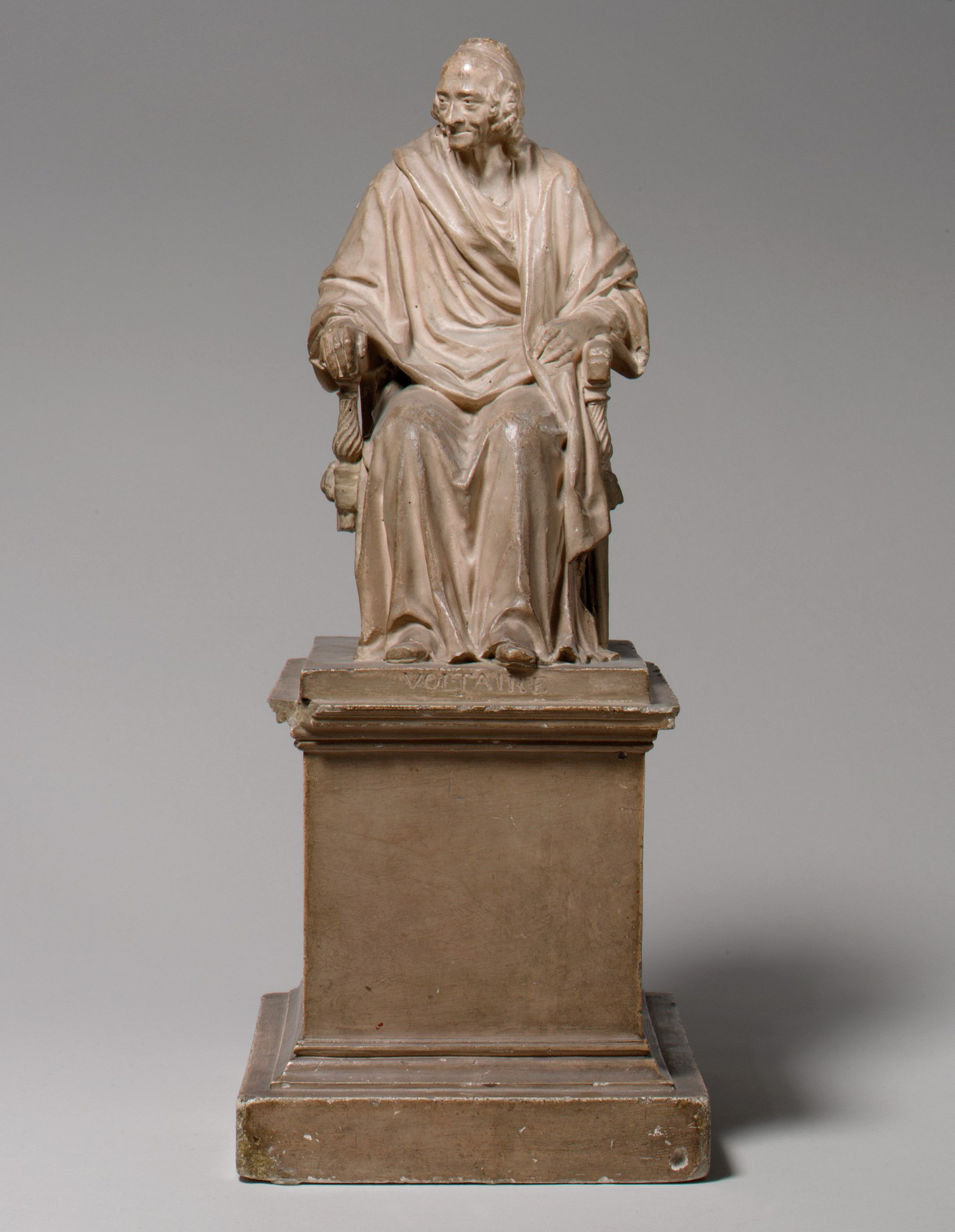
Seated Voltaire; by Jean-Antoine Houdon; 1778; plaster, tinted to imitate terracotta; overall: 35.6 cm × 14.6 cm × 20 cm (14.0 in × 5.7 in × 7.9 in); Metropolitan Museum of Art

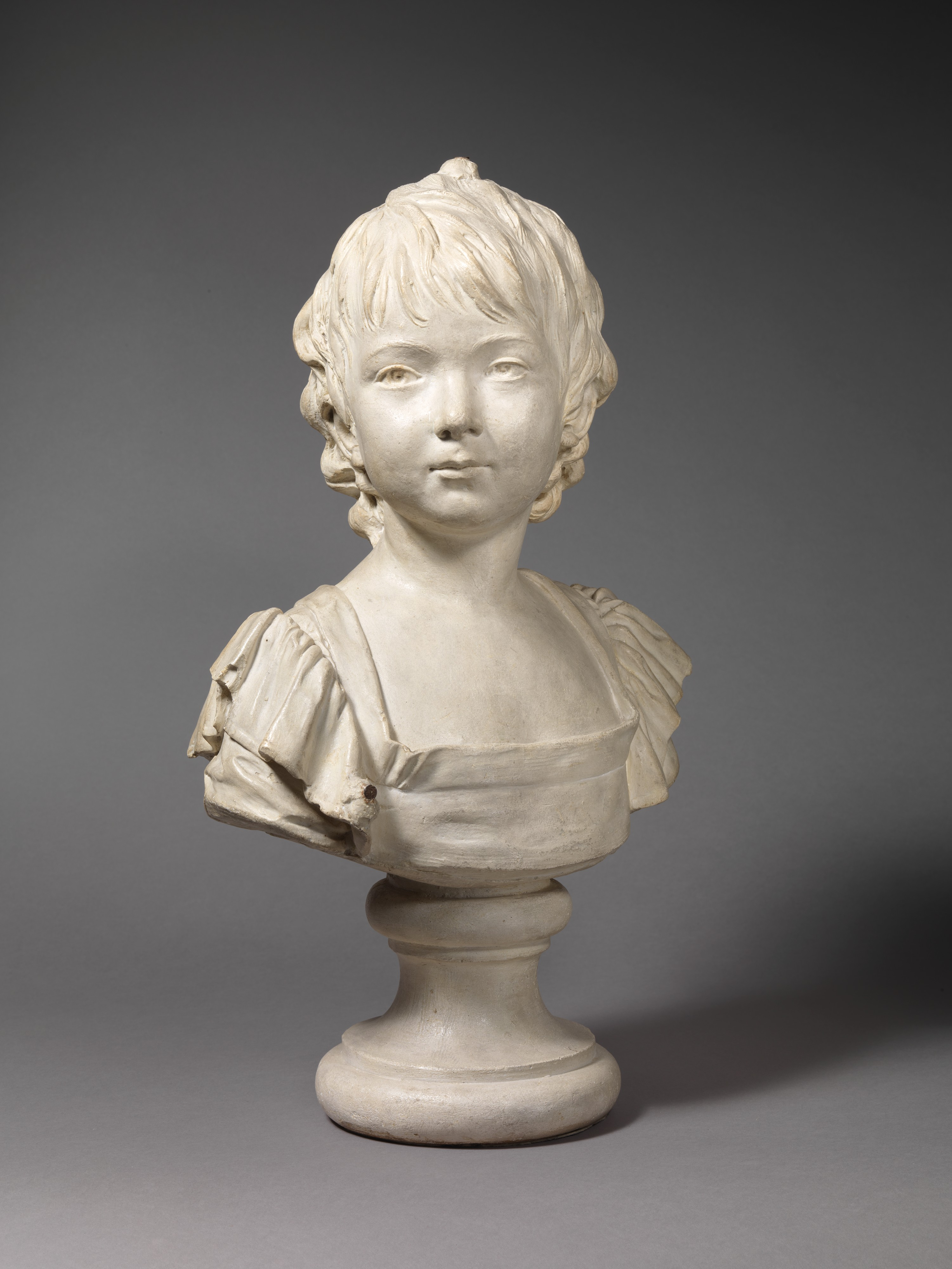
Young girl; first modeled: 1779–1780; plaster; height: 36.8 cm (14 1/2 in); Metropolitan Museum of Art

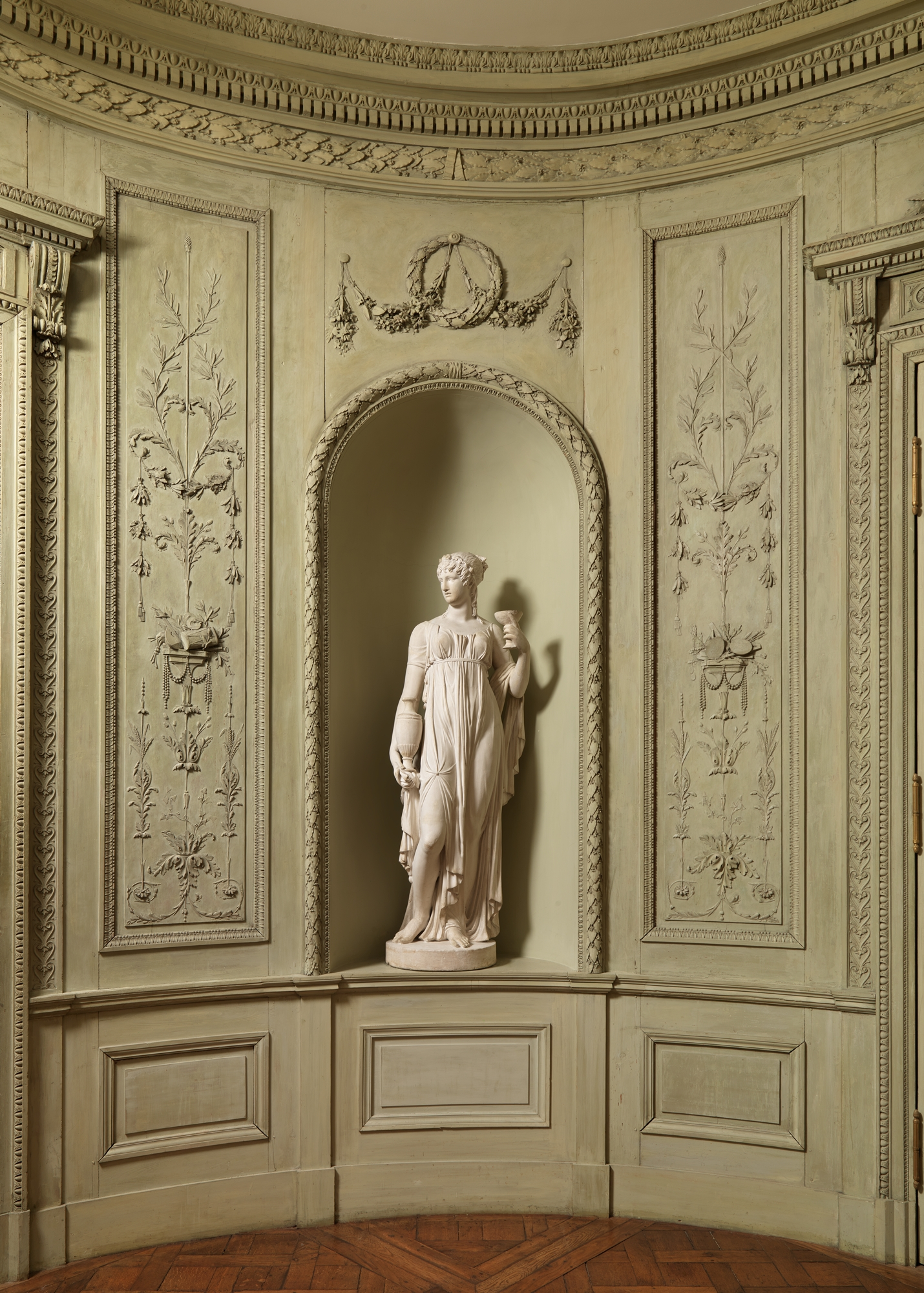
Nymph; 1805–1810; plaster; height: 155.6 cm (5 ft); Metropolitan Museum of Art

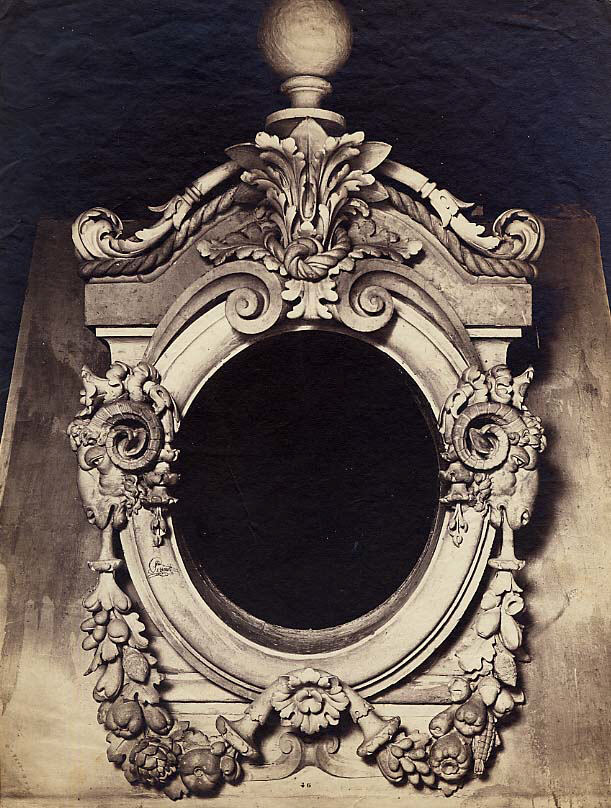
Photo of a plaster model of an ornamental oeil-de-boeuf for the new Louvre; circa 1856; Metropolitan Museum of Art

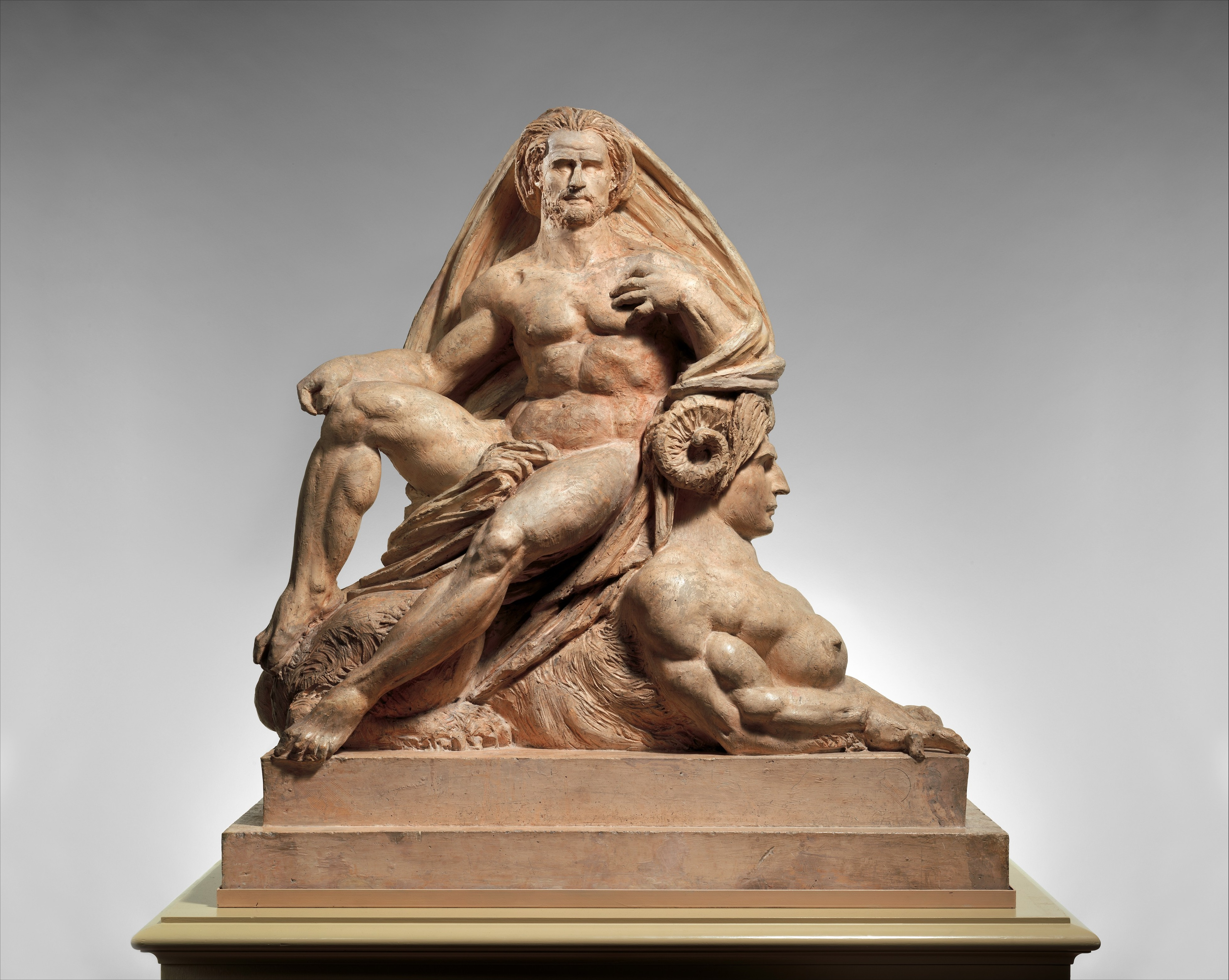
Jupiter and the Sphinx; 1868; tinted plaster; 116.8 cm × 112.1 cm × 60.3 cm (3 ft 10 in × 3 ft 8 1/4 in × 1 ft 11 3/4 in); Metropolitan Museum of Art

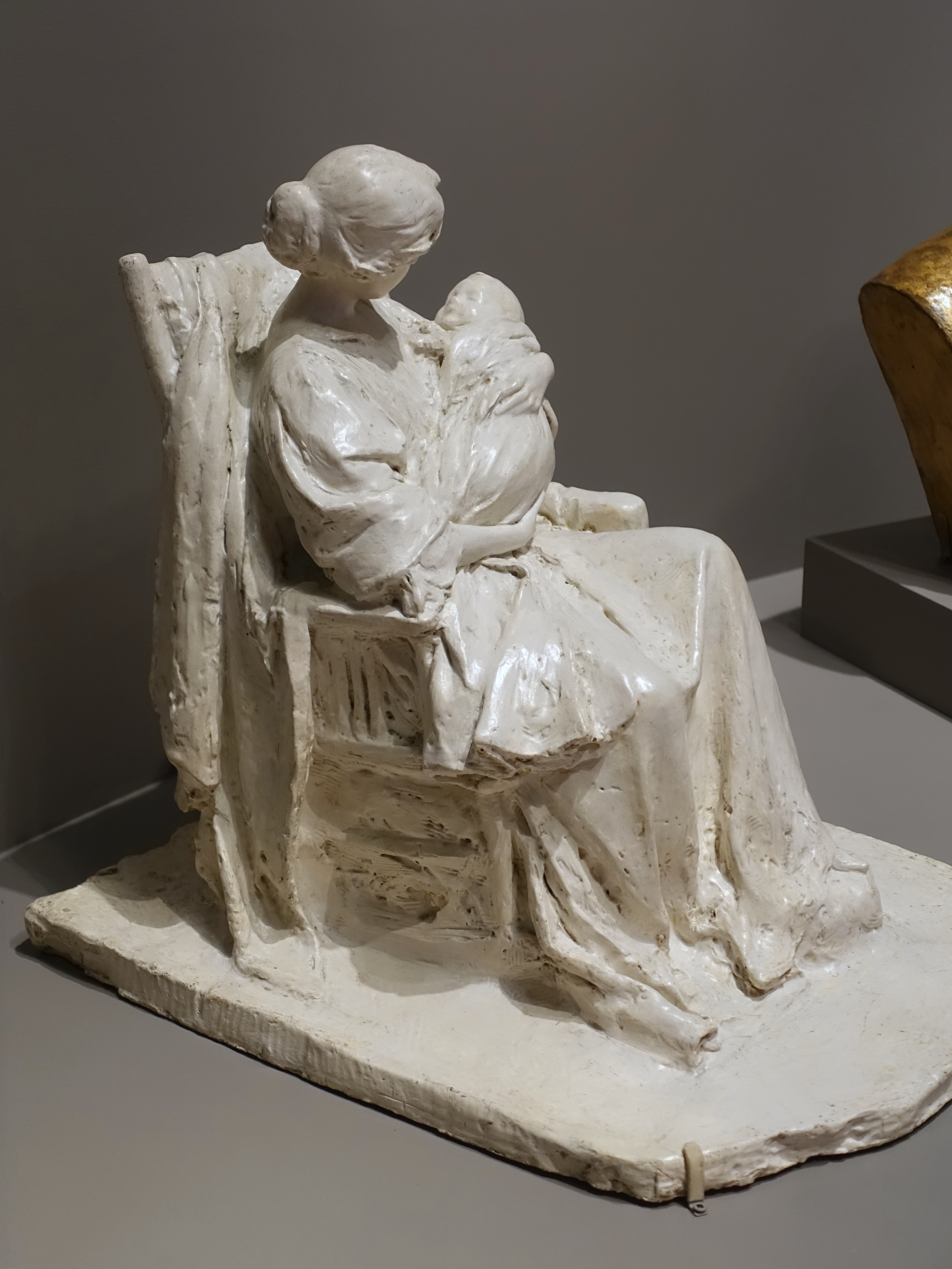
The Young Mother; by Bessie Potter Vonnoh; circa 1896; plaster; Portland Museum of Art (Portland, US)

== Safety issues ==
The chemical reaction that occurs when plaster is mixed with water is exothermic. When plaster sets, it can reach temperatures of more than 60 °C (140 °F) and, in large volumes, can burn the skin. In January 2007, a secondary school student in Lincolnshire, England sustained third-degree burns after encasing her hands in a bucket of plaster as part of a school art project, and most of her fingers and her thumbs required amputation. Plaster of paris generally has explicit warnings not to make castings in this way on the container and product labeling.

Plaster that contains powdered silica or asbestos presents health hazards if inhaled. Asbestos is a known irritant when inhaled and can cause cancer, especially in people who smoke, and inhalation can also cause asbestosis. Inhaled silica can cause silicosis and (in rare cases) can encourage the development of cancer.

People can be exposed to plaster of Paris in the workplace by inhaling or swallowing it, and by skin and eye contact. The Occupational Safety and Health Administration (OSHA) has set the legal limit (permissible exposure limit) for plaster of Paris exposure in the workplace as 15 mg/m^{3} total exposure, and 5 mg/m^{3} respiratory exposure over an 8-hour workday. The National Institute for Occupational Safety and Health (NIOSH) has set a Recommended exposure limit (REL) of 10 mg/m^{3} total exposure, and 5 mg/m^{3} respiratory exposure over an 8-hour workday.

== See also ==
- Cast Courts – Galleries in the Victoria and Albert Museum
- Joint compound – Gypsum paste for filling seams in drywall
- Lath and plaster – Finish mainly for interior dividing walls and ceilings
- Opus albarium
- Pargeting – Decorative or waterproof plaster applied to building walls
- Plasterwork – Construction or ornamentation done in plaster or a similar material
- Roughcast – Coarse plaster surface used on exterior walls
- Stucco – Construction material made of aggregates, a binder, and water
- Tadelakt – Moroccan waterproof plaster
