= Association for Preservation Technology International =

U.S. non-profit organization

The Association for Preservation Technology International (APT) is a not-for-profit, multidisciplinary, membership organization dedicated to promoting the best technology for conserving and preserving historic structures and their settings. Founded in 1968 by preservationists from Canada and the United States, it now has 1,500 members from 30 countries, with headquarters in Washington, DC. APT's activities include conferences, training and education programs, and publications on the technical aspects of preservation.

APT members include architects, engineers, conservators, consultants, contractors, craftspeople, curators, administrators, program managers, developers, educators, historians, landscape architects, materials suppliers, students, technicians, and others involved in historic preservation.

== History ==
Professionals in the field of historic preservation from Canada and the United States met in Canada in 1968 to form an organization that would promote the exchange of information and ideas pertaining to work on the constructed manifestation of cultural heritage, including not only buildings and landscapes, but also objects and collections. The organization's first four aims and objectives, as published in the first Newsletter in April 1969, were:

1. To provide a useful forum to promote the quality of professional practice in the field of historic preservation in Canada and the United States.
2. To encourage the research, collection and publication of technical information in all aspects of historic preservation.
3. To encourage the training of professionals in preservation and restoration technology.
4. To encourage the training of craftsmen in the traditional techniques and skills required for historic preservation.

The founding members were Alice Allison, David Bartlett, Gerald Budner, Jacques Dalibard, Oliver Torrey Fuller, George MacBeath, Pierre Mayrand, Jeanne Minhinnick, Lee Nelson, William Patterson, Charles E. Peterson, Jack Richardson, and Peter John Stokes.

The first president was Charles E. Peterson. Early members, including Martin E. Weaver, the organization's fifth president, and Morgan W. Phillips, were instrumental in establishing the field of architectural conservation.

== Mission ==
APT's mission is "to advance appropriate traditional and new technologies to care for, protect, and promote the longevity of the built environment and to cultivate the exchange of knowledge throughout the international community."

== Activities ==
=== Events ===
The initial impetus of the founders to combine the dissemination of scholarly studies of the history of building with discussions about the application of the philosophy and practice of heritage conservation technology resulted in a conference at the Pine Brook Conference Center in Upper Saranac Lake, New York, in 1969. The APT conference then became an annual event. Since 1975, training courses (now called workshops) were presented in conjunction with the conferences. From their inception, the conferences and training courses have been characterized by exchanges of ideas among practitioners, program managers and policy makers. APT has also presented training courses, workshops and symposia as stand-alone events, independent of annual conferences.

=== Publications ===
APT disseminates information through its website, electronic and print publications, and digital archives. The organization's flagship publication is the APT Bulletin, a peer-reviewed journal published quarterly. The newsletter, Communiqué, is published bimonthly and circulated by email.

APT periodically publishes books in the field of heritage conservation. The most recent publications are the second edition of Introduction to Early American Masonry by Harley J. McKee and The Structure of Skyscrapers in America, 1871–1900: Their History and Preservation by Donald Friedman.

To disseminate information on historic building materials and systems, APT created the Building Technology Heritage Library (BTHL), a digital collection of historic building trade catalogs hosted by the Internet Archive. The collection is growing and had over 14,000 items in October 2023.

=== Chapters ===
As of April 2025 there are 21 regional APT chapters, which allow interaction among members throughout the year. Fourteen chapters are in the United States, three are in Canada, and one each cover Australasia, Latin America and the Caribbean, Europe, and South Asia. Chapters host local events including workshops, symposia, and visits to sites of interest to members.

=== Technical Committees ===
Development and dissemination of technical information is mainly carried out by technical committees with specific focus areas. The technical committees are: Preservation Engineering, Sustainable Preservation, Modern Heritage, Documentation, Materials, and Codes and Standards.
