= Martin E. Weaver =

Martin E. Weaver (1938-2004) helped develop the scientific field of architectural conservation in the United States and internationally. He was the fifth president of the Association for Preservation Technology International from 1977 to 1980, the 2nd President of the ICOMOS International Wood Committee from 1983 to 1990, Director of the Center for Preservation Research at Columbia University from 1991 to 2003, and an expert in the conservation of wood-based architectural materials. Originally trained as an architect, his exposure to archaeological excavations in the United Kingdom, Greece, and Iran catalyzed his interest in historic preservation in the late 1960s. Weaver is well known from his 1997 book, Conserving Buildings, which he co-authored with Frank G. Matero.

== Bibliography ==
- ICCROM Newsletter (June 2005): p. 8.
- Weaver, Martin; Matero, Frank (1997). Conserving Buildings. New York: John Wiley & Sons.
