= APT Bulletin =

Peer-reviewed academic journal

- Discipline: Historic preservation
- Language: English
- Edited by: Josie Madison

Publication details
- Former names: Newsletter of the Association for Preservation Technology, Bulletin of the Association for Preservation Technology
- History: 1969−present
- Publisher: Association for Preservation Technology International
- Frequency: Quarterly

Standard abbreviations
- ISO 4: APT Bull.

Indexing
- ISSN: 0848-8525
- LCCN: 93640569
- JSTOR: 08488525
- OCLC no.: 61236541

Links
- Journal homepage

APT Bulletin is a quarterly peer-reviewed academic journal published by the Association for Preservation Technology International. It is currently edited by Josie Madison with the assistance of various guest editors. The content of APT Bulletin consists primarily of articles about the practice and technology of historic preservation, but essays and book reviews are also included.

== History ==
The journal began publication in 1969 as the Newsletter of the Association for Preservation Technology (1969), changing its name that same year to the Bulletin of the Association for Preservation Technology. The journal's title was shortened to the current APT Bulletin, starting with Volume 18 in 1986. Publication is nominally four issues per year, although two numbers are typically combined into a mid-year double issue (i.e., No. 2–3).

Guest-edited special issues of APT Bulletin have included articles on the following themes: the U.S. National Park Service (1978 and 1984), Parks Canada (1986), Guastavino tile vaults (1999), covered bridges (2004), modern heritage (2011 and 2017), and many others.
